

373001–373100 

|-bgcolor=#d6d6d6
| 373001 ||  || — || October 3, 2008 || Kitt Peak || Spacewatch || — || align=right | 2.9 km || 
|-id=002 bgcolor=#E9E9E9
| 373002 ||  || — || October 25, 2009 || Kitt Peak || Spacewatch || WIT || align=right | 1.0 km || 
|-id=003 bgcolor=#E9E9E9
| 373003 ||  || — || December 25, 2005 || Kitt Peak || Spacewatch || — || align=right | 1.9 km || 
|-id=004 bgcolor=#E9E9E9
| 373004 ||  || — || February 1, 2006 || Mount Lemmon || Mount Lemmon Survey || — || align=right | 1.8 km || 
|-id=005 bgcolor=#d6d6d6
| 373005 ||  || — || January 28, 2011 || Mount Lemmon || Mount Lemmon Survey || TIR || align=right | 3.1 km || 
|-id=006 bgcolor=#d6d6d6
| 373006 ||  || — || September 5, 2008 || Kitt Peak || Spacewatch || VER || align=right | 2.7 km || 
|-id=007 bgcolor=#d6d6d6
| 373007 ||  || — || September 25, 2008 || Mount Lemmon || Mount Lemmon Survey || — || align=right | 3.4 km || 
|-id=008 bgcolor=#d6d6d6
| 373008 ||  || — || September 28, 2003 || Anderson Mesa || LONEOS || EOS || align=right | 3.0 km || 
|-id=009 bgcolor=#d6d6d6
| 373009 ||  || — || March 30, 2000 || Kitt Peak || Spacewatch || THM || align=right | 2.4 km || 
|-id=010 bgcolor=#d6d6d6
| 373010 ||  || — || April 25, 2006 || Kitt Peak || Spacewatch || — || align=right | 3.4 km || 
|-id=011 bgcolor=#E9E9E9
| 373011 ||  || — || April 25, 2007 || Mount Lemmon || Mount Lemmon Survey || — || align=right | 3.2 km || 
|-id=012 bgcolor=#E9E9E9
| 373012 ||  || — || February 8, 2002 || Kitt Peak || Spacewatch || MRX || align=right data-sort-value="0.73" | 730 m || 
|-id=013 bgcolor=#d6d6d6
| 373013 ||  || — || April 2, 2006 || Kitt Peak || Spacewatch || EOS || align=right | 2.1 km || 
|-id=014 bgcolor=#d6d6d6
| 373014 ||  || — || February 5, 2010 || WISE || WISE || MEL || align=right | 4.8 km || 
|-id=015 bgcolor=#d6d6d6
| 373015 ||  || — || September 4, 2008 || Kitt Peak || Spacewatch || — || align=right | 3.4 km || 
|-id=016 bgcolor=#fefefe
| 373016 ||  || — || January 24, 2007 || Mount Lemmon || Mount Lemmon Survey || NYS || align=right data-sort-value="0.72" | 720 m || 
|-id=017 bgcolor=#d6d6d6
| 373017 ||  || — || January 4, 2011 || Mount Lemmon || Mount Lemmon Survey || — || align=right | 3.1 km || 
|-id=018 bgcolor=#E9E9E9
| 373018 ||  || — || September 17, 2004 || Kitt Peak || Spacewatch || — || align=right | 2.4 km || 
|-id=019 bgcolor=#E9E9E9
| 373019 ||  || — || October 1, 2005 || Catalina || CSS || — || align=right data-sort-value="0.96" | 960 m || 
|-id=020 bgcolor=#E9E9E9
| 373020 ||  || — || January 10, 2006 || Kitt Peak || Spacewatch || WIT || align=right | 1.2 km || 
|-id=021 bgcolor=#E9E9E9
| 373021 ||  || — || October 8, 2004 || Kitt Peak || Spacewatch || — || align=right | 1.8 km || 
|-id=022 bgcolor=#E9E9E9
| 373022 ||  || — || January 7, 2006 || Mount Lemmon || Mount Lemmon Survey || — || align=right | 2.3 km || 
|-id=023 bgcolor=#d6d6d6
| 373023 ||  || — || September 28, 1997 || Kitt Peak || Spacewatch || — || align=right | 2.9 km || 
|-id=024 bgcolor=#d6d6d6
| 373024 ||  || — || February 14, 2005 || Kitt Peak || Spacewatch || — || align=right | 3.5 km || 
|-id=025 bgcolor=#d6d6d6
| 373025 ||  || — || March 10, 2005 || Mount Lemmon || Mount Lemmon Survey || — || align=right | 3.0 km || 
|-id=026 bgcolor=#d6d6d6
| 373026 ||  || — || February 3, 2001 || Kitt Peak || Spacewatch || CHA || align=right | 1.9 km || 
|-id=027 bgcolor=#d6d6d6
| 373027 ||  || — || December 10, 2004 || Socorro || LINEAR || EOS || align=right | 2.8 km || 
|-id=028 bgcolor=#d6d6d6
| 373028 ||  || — || January 31, 2006 || Kitt Peak || Spacewatch || — || align=right | 2.8 km || 
|-id=029 bgcolor=#d6d6d6
| 373029 ||  || — || September 28, 2008 || Mount Lemmon || Mount Lemmon Survey || — || align=right | 2.6 km || 
|-id=030 bgcolor=#E9E9E9
| 373030 ||  || — || August 30, 2005 || Kitt Peak || Spacewatch || — || align=right data-sort-value="0.84" | 840 m || 
|-id=031 bgcolor=#E9E9E9
| 373031 ||  || — || November 3, 2010 || Mount Lemmon || Mount Lemmon Survey || — || align=right | 1.7 km || 
|-id=032 bgcolor=#E9E9E9
| 373032 ||  || — || October 30, 2005 || Catalina || CSS || — || align=right | 1.8 km || 
|-id=033 bgcolor=#d6d6d6
| 373033 ||  || — || March 3, 2005 || Catalina || CSS || VER || align=right | 3.7 km || 
|-id=034 bgcolor=#d6d6d6
| 373034 ||  || — || October 9, 2004 || Kitt Peak || Spacewatch || KOR || align=right | 1.6 km || 
|-id=035 bgcolor=#E9E9E9
| 373035 ||  || — || December 22, 2005 || Catalina || CSS || — || align=right | 2.2 km || 
|-id=036 bgcolor=#d6d6d6
| 373036 ||  || — || October 21, 2008 || Mount Lemmon || Mount Lemmon Survey || EOS || align=right | 2.1 km || 
|-id=037 bgcolor=#d6d6d6
| 373037 ||  || — || January 15, 2005 || Kitt Peak || Spacewatch || — || align=right | 3.6 km || 
|-id=038 bgcolor=#d6d6d6
| 373038 ||  || — || March 6, 2011 || Kitt Peak || Spacewatch || EOS || align=right | 2.2 km || 
|-id=039 bgcolor=#d6d6d6
| 373039 ||  || — || February 1, 2006 || Mount Lemmon || Mount Lemmon Survey || — || align=right | 3.1 km || 
|-id=040 bgcolor=#d6d6d6
| 373040 ||  || — || October 4, 2002 || Socorro || LINEAR || ALA || align=right | 4.4 km || 
|-id=041 bgcolor=#d6d6d6
| 373041 ||  || — || April 16, 2010 || WISE || WISE || — || align=right | 3.8 km || 
|-id=042 bgcolor=#d6d6d6
| 373042 ||  || — || June 30, 1997 || Kitt Peak || Spacewatch || — || align=right | 4.0 km || 
|-id=043 bgcolor=#E9E9E9
| 373043 ||  || — || October 7, 2005 || Catalina || CSS || — || align=right | 1.9 km || 
|-id=044 bgcolor=#d6d6d6
| 373044 ||  || — || January 8, 2010 || Mount Lemmon || Mount Lemmon Survey || — || align=right | 3.3 km || 
|-id=045 bgcolor=#d6d6d6
| 373045 ||  || — || May 31, 2001 || Kitt Peak || Spacewatch || EOS || align=right | 2.4 km || 
|-id=046 bgcolor=#d6d6d6
| 373046 ||  || — || May 21, 2006 || Kitt Peak || Spacewatch || — || align=right | 3.7 km || 
|-id=047 bgcolor=#d6d6d6
| 373047 ||  || — || October 29, 2005 || Kitt Peak || Spacewatch || — || align=right | 4.2 km || 
|-id=048 bgcolor=#E9E9E9
| 373048 ||  || — || October 10, 1999 || Kitt Peak || Spacewatch || — || align=right | 2.1 km || 
|-id=049 bgcolor=#E9E9E9
| 373049 ||  || — || October 9, 2004 || Socorro || LINEAR || — || align=right | 2.4 km || 
|-id=050 bgcolor=#E9E9E9
| 373050 ||  || — || December 9, 2004 || Kitt Peak || Spacewatch || AGN || align=right | 1.6 km || 
|-id=051 bgcolor=#d6d6d6
| 373051 ||  || — || March 8, 2005 || Kitt Peak || Spacewatch || HYG || align=right | 3.0 km || 
|-id=052 bgcolor=#d6d6d6
| 373052 ||  || — || February 7, 2006 || Mount Lemmon || Mount Lemmon Survey || — || align=right | 3.4 km || 
|-id=053 bgcolor=#E9E9E9
| 373053 ||  || — || October 4, 2004 || Kitt Peak || Spacewatch || — || align=right | 2.6 km || 
|-id=054 bgcolor=#d6d6d6
| 373054 ||  || — || March 24, 2006 || Kitt Peak || Spacewatch || — || align=right | 2.4 km || 
|-id=055 bgcolor=#d6d6d6
| 373055 ||  || — || December 3, 2004 || Anderson Mesa || LONEOS || — || align=right | 4.0 km || 
|-id=056 bgcolor=#d6d6d6
| 373056 ||  || — || September 6, 2008 || Kitt Peak || Spacewatch || — || align=right | 2.5 km || 
|-id=057 bgcolor=#d6d6d6
| 373057 ||  || — || October 2, 2008 || Mount Lemmon || Mount Lemmon Survey || — || align=right | 3.3 km || 
|-id=058 bgcolor=#d6d6d6
| 373058 ||  || — || March 3, 2006 || Mount Lemmon || Mount Lemmon Survey || — || align=right | 2.9 km || 
|-id=059 bgcolor=#E9E9E9
| 373059 ||  || — || January 13, 2002 || Socorro || LINEAR || — || align=right | 1.8 km || 
|-id=060 bgcolor=#E9E9E9
| 373060 ||  || — || September 24, 2009 || Mount Lemmon || Mount Lemmon Survey || MAR || align=right | 1.1 km || 
|-id=061 bgcolor=#d6d6d6
| 373061 ||  || — || September 23, 2008 || Kitt Peak || Spacewatch || — || align=right | 3.7 km || 
|-id=062 bgcolor=#E9E9E9
| 373062 ||  || — || September 27, 2009 || Mount Lemmon || Mount Lemmon Survey || — || align=right | 3.0 km || 
|-id=063 bgcolor=#d6d6d6
| 373063 ||  || — || March 2, 2006 || Kitt Peak || Spacewatch || — || align=right | 2.4 km || 
|-id=064 bgcolor=#d6d6d6
| 373064 ||  || — || February 14, 2005 || Kitt Peak || Spacewatch || — || align=right | 3.2 km || 
|-id=065 bgcolor=#d6d6d6
| 373065 ||  || — || January 15, 2005 || Kitt Peak || Spacewatch || HYG || align=right | 3.1 km || 
|-id=066 bgcolor=#d6d6d6
| 373066 ||  || — || December 1, 2003 || Kitt Peak || Spacewatch || EOS || align=right | 2.3 km || 
|-id=067 bgcolor=#d6d6d6
| 373067 ||  || — || March 3, 2005 || Catalina || CSS || — || align=right | 3.4 km || 
|-id=068 bgcolor=#E9E9E9
| 373068 ||  || — || March 15, 1997 || Kitt Peak || Spacewatch || — || align=right | 2.1 km || 
|-id=069 bgcolor=#d6d6d6
| 373069 ||  || — || April 5, 2000 || Socorro || LINEAR || — || align=right | 4.1 km || 
|-id=070 bgcolor=#d6d6d6
| 373070 ||  || — || October 8, 2008 || Kitt Peak || Spacewatch || HYG || align=right | 2.6 km || 
|-id=071 bgcolor=#d6d6d6
| 373071 ||  || — || April 2, 2005 || Catalina || CSS || — || align=right | 4.7 km || 
|-id=072 bgcolor=#d6d6d6
| 373072 ||  || — || December 17, 2009 || Mount Lemmon || Mount Lemmon Survey || — || align=right | 3.8 km || 
|-id=073 bgcolor=#d6d6d6
| 373073 ||  || — || February 11, 2011 || Catalina || CSS || — || align=right | 3.5 km || 
|-id=074 bgcolor=#E9E9E9
| 373074 ||  || — || September 16, 2004 || Kitt Peak || Spacewatch || NEM || align=right | 1.9 km || 
|-id=075 bgcolor=#d6d6d6
| 373075 ||  || — || January 28, 2006 || Kitt Peak || Spacewatch || KOR || align=right | 1.6 km || 
|-id=076 bgcolor=#d6d6d6
| 373076 ||  || — || April 11, 2005 || Kitt Peak || Spacewatch || 7:4 || align=right | 3.5 km || 
|-id=077 bgcolor=#d6d6d6
| 373077 ||  || — || December 10, 2004 || Kitt Peak || Spacewatch || KOR || align=right | 1.6 km || 
|-id=078 bgcolor=#d6d6d6
| 373078 ||  || — || February 1, 2000 || Kitt Peak || Spacewatch || — || align=right | 4.5 km || 
|-id=079 bgcolor=#d6d6d6
| 373079 ||  || — || February 20, 2006 || Kitt Peak || Spacewatch || KOR || align=right | 1.7 km || 
|-id=080 bgcolor=#d6d6d6
| 373080 ||  || — || April 9, 2006 || Kitt Peak || Spacewatch || — || align=right | 2.7 km || 
|-id=081 bgcolor=#E9E9E9
| 373081 ||  || — || June 8, 2007 || Kitt Peak || Spacewatch || WIT || align=right | 1.1 km || 
|-id=082 bgcolor=#d6d6d6
| 373082 ||  || — || October 17, 2003 || Kitt Peak || Spacewatch || — || align=right | 3.8 km || 
|-id=083 bgcolor=#d6d6d6
| 373083 ||  || — || March 5, 1994 || Kitt Peak || Spacewatch || — || align=right | 3.8 km || 
|-id=084 bgcolor=#d6d6d6
| 373084 ||  || — || November 27, 2009 || Mount Lemmon || Mount Lemmon Survey || EOS || align=right | 1.9 km || 
|-id=085 bgcolor=#d6d6d6
| 373085 ||  || — || April 9, 2005 || Kitt Peak || Spacewatch || ELF || align=right | 3.2 km || 
|-id=086 bgcolor=#d6d6d6
| 373086 ||  || — || December 12, 2004 || Kitt Peak || Spacewatch || NAE || align=right | 4.6 km || 
|-id=087 bgcolor=#d6d6d6
| 373087 ||  || — || January 13, 2005 || Kitt Peak || Spacewatch || — || align=right | 3.4 km || 
|-id=088 bgcolor=#d6d6d6
| 373088 ||  || — || October 9, 2008 || Mount Lemmon || Mount Lemmon Survey || — || align=right | 2.7 km || 
|-id=089 bgcolor=#d6d6d6
| 373089 ||  || — || January 28, 2000 || Kitt Peak || Spacewatch || — || align=right | 2.4 km || 
|-id=090 bgcolor=#E9E9E9
| 373090 ||  || — || September 21, 2009 || Kitt Peak || Spacewatch || — || align=right | 1.9 km || 
|-id=091 bgcolor=#E9E9E9
| 373091 ||  || — || October 10, 2004 || Kitt Peak || Spacewatch || AGN || align=right | 1.5 km || 
|-id=092 bgcolor=#d6d6d6
| 373092 ||  || — || April 6, 2010 || WISE || WISE || — || align=right | 4.8 km || 
|-id=093 bgcolor=#d6d6d6
| 373093 ||  || — || March 5, 2006 || Kitt Peak || Spacewatch || — || align=right | 3.0 km || 
|-id=094 bgcolor=#d6d6d6
| 373094 ||  || — || December 18, 2003 || Socorro || LINEAR || — || align=right | 5.4 km || 
|-id=095 bgcolor=#d6d6d6
| 373095 ||  || — || February 1, 2005 || Catalina || CSS || — || align=right | 4.1 km || 
|-id=096 bgcolor=#d6d6d6
| 373096 ||  || — || October 20, 2003 || Kitt Peak || Spacewatch || THM || align=right | 3.7 km || 
|-id=097 bgcolor=#d6d6d6
| 373097 ||  || — || February 9, 2005 || Anderson Mesa || LONEOS || — || align=right | 4.6 km || 
|-id=098 bgcolor=#d6d6d6
| 373098 ||  || — || September 28, 2003 || Kitt Peak || Spacewatch || EOS || align=right | 1.8 km || 
|-id=099 bgcolor=#E9E9E9
| 373099 ||  || — || October 7, 2004 || Kitt Peak || Spacewatch || — || align=right | 3.1 km || 
|-id=100 bgcolor=#d6d6d6
| 373100 ||  || — || January 15, 2005 || Kitt Peak || Spacewatch || — || align=right | 2.2 km || 
|}

373101–373200 

|-bgcolor=#d6d6d6
| 373101 ||  || — || January 6, 2010 || Kitt Peak || Spacewatch || — || align=right | 3.1 km || 
|-id=102 bgcolor=#d6d6d6
| 373102 ||  || — || October 19, 2003 || Kitt Peak || Spacewatch || — || align=right | 3.4 km || 
|-id=103 bgcolor=#d6d6d6
| 373103 ||  || — || March 11, 2005 || Catalina || CSS || ALA || align=right | 3.5 km || 
|-id=104 bgcolor=#d6d6d6
| 373104 ||  || — || May 19, 2006 || Catalina || CSS || — || align=right | 3.9 km || 
|-id=105 bgcolor=#E9E9E9
| 373105 ||  || — || March 11, 2007 || Catalina || CSS || — || align=right | 1.2 km || 
|-id=106 bgcolor=#d6d6d6
| 373106 ||  || — || March 9, 2005 || Mount Lemmon || Mount Lemmon Survey || — || align=right | 3.7 km || 
|-id=107 bgcolor=#d6d6d6
| 373107 ||  || — || March 26, 2006 || Mount Lemmon || Mount Lemmon Survey || — || align=right | 3.0 km || 
|-id=108 bgcolor=#d6d6d6
| 373108 ||  || — || March 5, 2006 || Kitt Peak || Spacewatch || — || align=right | 3.0 km || 
|-id=109 bgcolor=#d6d6d6
| 373109 ||  || — || September 7, 2008 || Mount Lemmon || Mount Lemmon Survey || KOR || align=right | 1.3 km || 
|-id=110 bgcolor=#d6d6d6
| 373110 ||  || — || January 19, 2005 || Kitt Peak || Spacewatch || EOS || align=right | 2.4 km || 
|-id=111 bgcolor=#d6d6d6
| 373111 ||  || — || August 13, 2002 || Kitt Peak || Spacewatch || — || align=right | 3.8 km || 
|-id=112 bgcolor=#d6d6d6
| 373112 ||  || — || January 16, 2005 || Catalina || CSS || — || align=right | 4.4 km || 
|-id=113 bgcolor=#E9E9E9
| 373113 ||  || — || October 7, 2004 || Anderson Mesa || LONEOS || — || align=right | 3.3 km || 
|-id=114 bgcolor=#d6d6d6
| 373114 ||  || — || October 7, 2008 || Mount Lemmon || Mount Lemmon Survey || — || align=right | 3.9 km || 
|-id=115 bgcolor=#d6d6d6
| 373115 ||  || — || September 30, 2005 || Anderson Mesa || LONEOS || HIL3:2 || align=right | 7.4 km || 
|-id=116 bgcolor=#d6d6d6
| 373116 ||  || — || March 16, 2005 || Catalina || CSS || EOS || align=right | 2.3 km || 
|-id=117 bgcolor=#d6d6d6
| 373117 ||  || — || May 23, 2006 || Kitt Peak || Spacewatch || — || align=right | 4.4 km || 
|-id=118 bgcolor=#d6d6d6
| 373118 ||  || — || February 2, 2005 || Catalina || CSS || LIX || align=right | 3.9 km || 
|-id=119 bgcolor=#E9E9E9
| 373119 ||  || — || December 30, 2005 || Catalina || CSS || EUN || align=right | 1.7 km || 
|-id=120 bgcolor=#d6d6d6
| 373120 ||  || — || May 1, 2006 || Kitt Peak || Spacewatch || — || align=right | 3.2 km || 
|-id=121 bgcolor=#d6d6d6
| 373121 ||  || — || March 9, 2005 || Mount Lemmon || Mount Lemmon Survey || — || align=right | 4.4 km || 
|-id=122 bgcolor=#d6d6d6
| 373122 ||  || — || March 11, 2005 || Kitt Peak || Spacewatch || — || align=right | 3.3 km || 
|-id=123 bgcolor=#d6d6d6
| 373123 ||  || — || March 16, 2005 || Mount Lemmon || Mount Lemmon Survey || — || align=right | 3.9 km || 
|-id=124 bgcolor=#d6d6d6
| 373124 ||  || — || March 16, 2005 || Kitt Peak || Spacewatch || — || align=right | 3.5 km || 
|-id=125 bgcolor=#d6d6d6
| 373125 ||  || — || March 13, 2005 || Kitt Peak || Spacewatch || — || align=right | 3.2 km || 
|-id=126 bgcolor=#d6d6d6
| 373126 ||  || — || April 24, 2006 || Anderson Mesa || LONEOS || — || align=right | 2.9 km || 
|-id=127 bgcolor=#d6d6d6
| 373127 ||  || — || March 8, 2005 || Kitt Peak || Spacewatch || — || align=right | 2.9 km || 
|-id=128 bgcolor=#d6d6d6
| 373128 ||  || — || September 13, 2007 || Catalina || CSS || — || align=right | 4.5 km || 
|-id=129 bgcolor=#d6d6d6
| 373129 ||  || — || May 21, 2006 || Kitt Peak || Spacewatch || EOS || align=right | 2.7 km || 
|-id=130 bgcolor=#E9E9E9
| 373130 ||  || — || December 18, 2001 || Socorro || LINEAR || — || align=right data-sort-value="0.91" | 910 m || 
|-id=131 bgcolor=#d6d6d6
| 373131 ||  || — || January 7, 2010 || Kitt Peak || Spacewatch || EOS || align=right | 1.9 km || 
|-id=132 bgcolor=#d6d6d6
| 373132 ||  || — || March 17, 2005 || Kitt Peak || Spacewatch || — || align=right | 2.9 km || 
|-id=133 bgcolor=#d6d6d6
| 373133 ||  || — || May 26, 2006 || Catalina || CSS || — || align=right | 4.4 km || 
|-id=134 bgcolor=#d6d6d6
| 373134 ||  || — || April 11, 1999 || Kitt Peak || Spacewatch || TIR || align=right | 2.9 km || 
|-id=135 bgcolor=#FFC2E0
| 373135 ||  || — || September 24, 2011 || Mount Lemmon || Mount Lemmon Survey || APOPHAcritical || align=right | 1.1 km || 
|-id=136 bgcolor=#fefefe
| 373136 ||  || — || June 18, 2010 || WISE || WISE || — || align=right | 3.0 km || 
|-id=137 bgcolor=#fefefe
| 373137 ||  || — || December 22, 2003 || Kitt Peak || Spacewatch || H || align=right data-sort-value="0.64" | 640 m || 
|-id=138 bgcolor=#fefefe
| 373138 ||  || — || December 25, 2011 || Kitt Peak || Spacewatch || H || align=right data-sort-value="0.56" | 560 m || 
|-id=139 bgcolor=#fefefe
| 373139 ||  || — || November 2, 2007 || Kitt Peak || Spacewatch || — || align=right data-sort-value="0.86" | 860 m || 
|-id=140 bgcolor=#fefefe
| 373140 ||  || — || January 18, 2004 || Catalina || CSS || H || align=right data-sort-value="0.71" | 710 m || 
|-id=141 bgcolor=#E9E9E9
| 373141 ||  || — || February 18, 2008 || Mount Lemmon || Mount Lemmon Survey || — || align=right | 2.8 km || 
|-id=142 bgcolor=#fefefe
| 373142 ||  || — || March 8, 2005 || Kitt Peak || Spacewatch || — || align=right data-sort-value="0.89" | 890 m || 
|-id=143 bgcolor=#fefefe
| 373143 ||  || — || December 15, 2007 || Kitt Peak || Spacewatch || ERI || align=right | 1.6 km || 
|-id=144 bgcolor=#fefefe
| 373144 ||  || — || May 11, 2002 || Socorro || LINEAR || NYS || align=right data-sort-value="0.73" | 730 m || 
|-id=145 bgcolor=#fefefe
| 373145 ||  || — || March 20, 2007 || Catalina || CSS || H || align=right data-sort-value="0.85" | 850 m || 
|-id=146 bgcolor=#fefefe
| 373146 ||  || — || October 3, 2005 || Siding Spring || SSS || H || align=right data-sort-value="0.66" | 660 m || 
|-id=147 bgcolor=#fefefe
| 373147 ||  || — || September 15, 2010 || Mount Lemmon || Mount Lemmon Survey || — || align=right data-sort-value="0.75" | 750 m || 
|-id=148 bgcolor=#fefefe
| 373148 ||  || — || April 5, 2005 || Catalina || CSS || ERI || align=right | 1.7 km || 
|-id=149 bgcolor=#fefefe
| 373149 ||  || — || October 9, 2007 || Kitt Peak || Spacewatch || — || align=right data-sort-value="0.71" | 710 m || 
|-id=150 bgcolor=#fefefe
| 373150 ||  || — || April 6, 2005 || Catalina || CSS || — || align=right | 1.1 km || 
|-id=151 bgcolor=#fefefe
| 373151 ||  || — || March 11, 2005 || Kitt Peak || Spacewatch || NYS || align=right data-sort-value="0.60" | 600 m || 
|-id=152 bgcolor=#fefefe
| 373152 ||  || — || September 29, 2003 || Kitt Peak || Spacewatch || — || align=right data-sort-value="0.78" | 780 m || 
|-id=153 bgcolor=#E9E9E9
| 373153 ||  || — || December 29, 2011 || Catalina || CSS || BAR || align=right | 1.8 km || 
|-id=154 bgcolor=#E9E9E9
| 373154 ||  || — || February 7, 2008 || Kitt Peak || Spacewatch || — || align=right data-sort-value="0.98" | 980 m || 
|-id=155 bgcolor=#fefefe
| 373155 ||  || — || March 21, 2002 || Kitt Peak || Spacewatch || — || align=right data-sort-value="0.61" | 610 m || 
|-id=156 bgcolor=#fefefe
| 373156 ||  || — || May 26, 2009 || Catalina || CSS || NYS || align=right data-sort-value="0.79" | 790 m || 
|-id=157 bgcolor=#fefefe
| 373157 ||  || — || January 13, 2005 || Kitt Peak || Spacewatch || — || align=right data-sort-value="0.92" | 920 m || 
|-id=158 bgcolor=#fefefe
| 373158 ||  || — || March 26, 2006 || Kitt Peak || Spacewatch || FLO || align=right data-sort-value="0.55" | 550 m || 
|-id=159 bgcolor=#fefefe
| 373159 ||  || — || October 8, 2007 || Mount Lemmon || Mount Lemmon Survey || — || align=right data-sort-value="0.62" | 620 m || 
|-id=160 bgcolor=#fefefe
| 373160 ||  || — || May 11, 2005 || Mount Lemmon || Mount Lemmon Survey || NYS || align=right data-sort-value="0.62" | 620 m || 
|-id=161 bgcolor=#fefefe
| 373161 ||  || — || February 2, 2005 || Kitt Peak || Spacewatch || — || align=right data-sort-value="0.83" | 830 m || 
|-id=162 bgcolor=#fefefe
| 373162 ||  || — || March 28, 2009 || Siding Spring || SSS || — || align=right data-sort-value="0.85" | 850 m || 
|-id=163 bgcolor=#fefefe
| 373163 ||  || — || February 1, 2012 || Kitt Peak || Spacewatch || — || align=right data-sort-value="0.92" | 920 m || 
|-id=164 bgcolor=#fefefe
| 373164 ||  || — || June 27, 2005 || Mount Lemmon || Mount Lemmon Survey || NYS || align=right data-sort-value="0.67" | 670 m || 
|-id=165 bgcolor=#fefefe
| 373165 ||  || — || January 17, 2005 || Kitt Peak || Spacewatch || PHO || align=right data-sort-value="0.96" | 960 m || 
|-id=166 bgcolor=#E9E9E9
| 373166 ||  || — || April 14, 2008 || Catalina || CSS || JUN || align=right | 1.2 km || 
|-id=167 bgcolor=#fefefe
| 373167 ||  || — || September 26, 2006 || Mount Lemmon || Mount Lemmon Survey || — || align=right | 1.1 km || 
|-id=168 bgcolor=#E9E9E9
| 373168 ||  || — || March 7, 2003 || Kitt Peak || Spacewatch || — || align=right | 3.1 km || 
|-id=169 bgcolor=#fefefe
| 373169 ||  || — || January 15, 2005 || Kitt Peak || Spacewatch || — || align=right data-sort-value="0.93" | 930 m || 
|-id=170 bgcolor=#E9E9E9
| 373170 ||  || — || July 8, 2004 || Siding Spring || SSS || — || align=right | 3.5 km || 
|-id=171 bgcolor=#fefefe
| 373171 ||  || — || March 16, 2005 || Catalina || CSS || FLO || align=right data-sort-value="0.62" | 620 m || 
|-id=172 bgcolor=#fefefe
| 373172 ||  || — || April 11, 2005 || Kitt Peak || Spacewatch || — || align=right data-sort-value="0.75" | 750 m || 
|-id=173 bgcolor=#fefefe
| 373173 ||  || — || February 9, 2005 || Kitt Peak || Spacewatch || NYS || align=right data-sort-value="0.72" | 720 m || 
|-id=174 bgcolor=#fefefe
| 373174 ||  || — || January 19, 2005 || Kitt Peak || Spacewatch || FLO || align=right data-sort-value="0.63" | 630 m || 
|-id=175 bgcolor=#fefefe
| 373175 ||  || — || March 18, 2005 || Catalina || CSS || ERI || align=right | 1.5 km || 
|-id=176 bgcolor=#fefefe
| 373176 ||  || — || November 12, 2007 || Mount Lemmon || Mount Lemmon Survey || — || align=right data-sort-value="0.80" | 800 m || 
|-id=177 bgcolor=#fefefe
| 373177 ||  || — || April 4, 2005 || Kitt Peak || Spacewatch || NYS || align=right data-sort-value="0.69" | 690 m || 
|-id=178 bgcolor=#E9E9E9
| 373178 ||  || — || February 23, 2012 || Kitt Peak || Spacewatch || — || align=right | 1.8 km || 
|-id=179 bgcolor=#fefefe
| 373179 ||  || — || May 30, 2006 || Mount Lemmon || Mount Lemmon Survey || — || align=right data-sort-value="0.85" | 850 m || 
|-id=180 bgcolor=#fefefe
| 373180 ||  || — || February 10, 2008 || Kitt Peak || Spacewatch || MAS || align=right data-sort-value="0.71" | 710 m || 
|-id=181 bgcolor=#fefefe
| 373181 ||  || — || November 9, 2007 || Kitt Peak || Spacewatch || — || align=right data-sort-value="0.75" | 750 m || 
|-id=182 bgcolor=#E9E9E9
| 373182 ||  || — || September 25, 2009 || Kitt Peak || Spacewatch || — || align=right | 1.8 km || 
|-id=183 bgcolor=#fefefe
| 373183 ||  || — || August 28, 2006 || Kitt Peak || Spacewatch || FLO || align=right data-sort-value="0.59" | 590 m || 
|-id=184 bgcolor=#E9E9E9
| 373184 ||  || — || April 4, 2008 || Kitt Peak || Spacewatch || — || align=right | 1.7 km || 
|-id=185 bgcolor=#E9E9E9
| 373185 ||  || — || September 26, 1992 || Kitt Peak || Spacewatch || — || align=right | 1.7 km || 
|-id=186 bgcolor=#fefefe
| 373186 ||  || — || March 16, 2001 || Kitt Peak || Spacewatch || — || align=right | 1.0 km || 
|-id=187 bgcolor=#fefefe
| 373187 ||  || — || March 11, 2005 || Kitt Peak || Spacewatch || — || align=right data-sort-value="0.73" | 730 m || 
|-id=188 bgcolor=#fefefe
| 373188 ||  || — || December 31, 2007 || Mount Lemmon || Mount Lemmon Survey || NYS || align=right data-sort-value="0.71" | 710 m || 
|-id=189 bgcolor=#fefefe
| 373189 ||  || — || February 7, 2002 || Socorro || LINEAR || FLO || align=right data-sort-value="0.58" | 580 m || 
|-id=190 bgcolor=#fefefe
| 373190 ||  || — || July 12, 2005 || Mount Lemmon || Mount Lemmon Survey || — || align=right data-sort-value="0.89" | 890 m || 
|-id=191 bgcolor=#fefefe
| 373191 ||  || — || April 24, 2009 || Mount Lemmon || Mount Lemmon Survey || FLO || align=right data-sort-value="0.54" | 540 m || 
|-id=192 bgcolor=#fefefe
| 373192 ||  || — || March 14, 2005 || Mount Lemmon || Mount Lemmon Survey || NYS || align=right data-sort-value="0.66" | 660 m || 
|-id=193 bgcolor=#fefefe
| 373193 ||  || — || June 10, 2005 || Kitt Peak || Spacewatch || NYS || align=right data-sort-value="0.62" | 620 m || 
|-id=194 bgcolor=#fefefe
| 373194 ||  || — || January 17, 2005 || Kitt Peak || Spacewatch || — || align=right data-sort-value="0.62" | 620 m || 
|-id=195 bgcolor=#fefefe
| 373195 ||  || — || November 4, 2007 || Kitt Peak || Spacewatch || — || align=right data-sort-value="0.71" | 710 m || 
|-id=196 bgcolor=#E9E9E9
| 373196 ||  || — || December 14, 2010 || Mount Lemmon || Mount Lemmon Survey || CLO || align=right | 3.1 km || 
|-id=197 bgcolor=#fefefe
| 373197 ||  || — || October 31, 2010 || Kitt Peak || Spacewatch || — || align=right | 1.0 km || 
|-id=198 bgcolor=#fefefe
| 373198 ||  || — || October 11, 2010 || Mount Lemmon || Mount Lemmon Survey || — || align=right | 1.0 km || 
|-id=199 bgcolor=#fefefe
| 373199 ||  || — || October 10, 2010 || Mount Lemmon || Mount Lemmon Survey || — || align=right data-sort-value="0.74" | 740 m || 
|-id=200 bgcolor=#fefefe
| 373200 ||  || — || February 10, 2008 || Kitt Peak || Spacewatch || MAS || align=right data-sort-value="0.74" | 740 m || 
|}

373201–373300 

|-bgcolor=#fefefe
| 373201 ||  || — || March 4, 2005 || Kitt Peak || Spacewatch || — || align=right data-sort-value="0.91" | 910 m || 
|-id=202 bgcolor=#fefefe
| 373202 ||  || — || March 9, 2005 || Catalina || CSS || — || align=right | 1.4 km || 
|-id=203 bgcolor=#fefefe
| 373203 ||  || — || March 12, 2002 || Kitt Peak || Spacewatch || — || align=right data-sort-value="0.72" | 720 m || 
|-id=204 bgcolor=#fefefe
| 373204 ||  || — || September 17, 2006 || Kitt Peak || Spacewatch || V || align=right data-sort-value="0.65" | 650 m || 
|-id=205 bgcolor=#fefefe
| 373205 ||  || — || March 16, 2005 || Mount Lemmon || Mount Lemmon Survey || — || align=right data-sort-value="0.80" | 800 m || 
|-id=206 bgcolor=#fefefe
| 373206 ||  || — || August 4, 2003 || Socorro || LINEAR || — || align=right data-sort-value="0.80" | 800 m || 
|-id=207 bgcolor=#fefefe
| 373207 ||  || — || March 4, 2005 || Mount Lemmon || Mount Lemmon Survey || NYS || align=right data-sort-value="0.59" | 590 m || 
|-id=208 bgcolor=#fefefe
| 373208 ||  || — || February 8, 2002 || Kitt Peak || Spacewatch || FLO || align=right data-sort-value="0.56" | 560 m || 
|-id=209 bgcolor=#E9E9E9
| 373209 ||  || — || March 28, 2008 || Kitt Peak || Spacewatch || — || align=right | 1.4 km || 
|-id=210 bgcolor=#fefefe
| 373210 ||  || — || September 19, 2003 || Kitt Peak || Spacewatch || — || align=right data-sort-value="0.74" | 740 m || 
|-id=211 bgcolor=#fefefe
| 373211 ||  || — || October 17, 2010 || Mount Lemmon || Mount Lemmon Survey || — || align=right data-sort-value="0.82" | 820 m || 
|-id=212 bgcolor=#fefefe
| 373212 ||  || — || January 18, 2008 || Kitt Peak || Spacewatch || — || align=right data-sort-value="0.92" | 920 m || 
|-id=213 bgcolor=#E9E9E9
| 373213 ||  || — || November 10, 2005 || Kitt Peak || Spacewatch || — || align=right | 2.7 km || 
|-id=214 bgcolor=#fefefe
| 373214 ||  || — || May 18, 2001 || Kitt Peak || Spacewatch || — || align=right | 1.0 km || 
|-id=215 bgcolor=#fefefe
| 373215 ||  || — || May 9, 2005 || Kitt Peak || Spacewatch || V || align=right data-sort-value="0.68" | 680 m || 
|-id=216 bgcolor=#fefefe
| 373216 ||  || — || June 15, 2005 || Mount Lemmon || Mount Lemmon Survey || — || align=right data-sort-value="0.92" | 920 m || 
|-id=217 bgcolor=#fefefe
| 373217 ||  || — || February 12, 2008 || Mount Lemmon || Mount Lemmon Survey || — || align=right data-sort-value="0.75" | 750 m || 
|-id=218 bgcolor=#fefefe
| 373218 ||  || — || April 16, 2005 || Kitt Peak || Spacewatch || — || align=right data-sort-value="0.68" | 680 m || 
|-id=219 bgcolor=#fefefe
| 373219 ||  || — || February 10, 2008 || Kitt Peak || Spacewatch || V || align=right data-sort-value="0.58" | 580 m || 
|-id=220 bgcolor=#fefefe
| 373220 ||  || — || January 14, 2008 || Kitt Peak || Spacewatch || MAS || align=right data-sort-value="0.69" | 690 m || 
|-id=221 bgcolor=#E9E9E9
| 373221 ||  || — || April 5, 2008 || Kitt Peak || Spacewatch || — || align=right | 1.1 km || 
|-id=222 bgcolor=#fefefe
| 373222 ||  || — || April 6, 2005 || Kitt Peak || Spacewatch || — || align=right data-sort-value="0.84" | 840 m || 
|-id=223 bgcolor=#fefefe
| 373223 ||  || — || May 28, 1998 || Kitt Peak || Spacewatch || — || align=right data-sort-value="0.70" | 700 m || 
|-id=224 bgcolor=#fefefe
| 373224 ||  || — || March 19, 2001 || Anderson Mesa || LONEOS || — || align=right data-sort-value="0.81" | 810 m || 
|-id=225 bgcolor=#E9E9E9
| 373225 ||  || — || April 14, 2008 || Mount Lemmon || Mount Lemmon Survey || — || align=right | 1.4 km || 
|-id=226 bgcolor=#E9E9E9
| 373226 ||  || — || April 5, 2008 || Kitt Peak || Spacewatch || — || align=right data-sort-value="0.97" | 970 m || 
|-id=227 bgcolor=#fefefe
| 373227 ||  || — || February 8, 2008 || Mount Lemmon || Mount Lemmon Survey || NYS || align=right data-sort-value="0.58" | 580 m || 
|-id=228 bgcolor=#E9E9E9
| 373228 ||  || — || June 14, 2004 || Kitt Peak || Spacewatch || MRX || align=right | 1.1 km || 
|-id=229 bgcolor=#E9E9E9
| 373229 ||  || — || March 31, 2003 || Kitt Peak || Spacewatch || — || align=right | 2.2 km || 
|-id=230 bgcolor=#fefefe
| 373230 ||  || — || December 22, 2003 || Kitt Peak || Spacewatch || V || align=right data-sort-value="0.74" | 740 m || 
|-id=231 bgcolor=#fefefe
| 373231 ||  || — || April 16, 2005 || Kitt Peak || Spacewatch || NYS || align=right data-sort-value="0.68" | 680 m || 
|-id=232 bgcolor=#fefefe
| 373232 ||  || — || March 12, 2005 || Kitt Peak || Spacewatch || — || align=right | 1.2 km || 
|-id=233 bgcolor=#fefefe
| 373233 ||  || — || January 30, 2004 || Kitt Peak || Spacewatch || — || align=right | 1.00 km || 
|-id=234 bgcolor=#E9E9E9
| 373234 ||  || — || December 13, 2010 || Mount Lemmon || Mount Lemmon Survey || — || align=right | 3.0 km || 
|-id=235 bgcolor=#E9E9E9
| 373235 ||  || — || September 22, 2009 || Mount Lemmon || Mount Lemmon Survey || — || align=right | 1.5 km || 
|-id=236 bgcolor=#d6d6d6
| 373236 ||  || — || November 9, 2009 || Mount Lemmon || Mount Lemmon Survey || — || align=right | 4.0 km || 
|-id=237 bgcolor=#fefefe
| 373237 ||  || — || September 30, 2006 || Mount Lemmon || Mount Lemmon Survey || — || align=right | 1.0 km || 
|-id=238 bgcolor=#fefefe
| 373238 ||  || — || November 18, 2007 || Mount Lemmon || Mount Lemmon Survey || — || align=right data-sort-value="0.82" | 820 m || 
|-id=239 bgcolor=#E9E9E9
| 373239 ||  || — || September 16, 2009 || Kitt Peak || Spacewatch || RAF || align=right data-sort-value="0.94" | 940 m || 
|-id=240 bgcolor=#fefefe
| 373240 ||  || — || January 10, 2008 || Kitt Peak || Spacewatch || FLO || align=right data-sort-value="0.78" | 780 m || 
|-id=241 bgcolor=#fefefe
| 373241 ||  || — || March 16, 2002 || Kitt Peak || Spacewatch || — || align=right data-sort-value="0.92" | 920 m || 
|-id=242 bgcolor=#fefefe
| 373242 ||  || — || April 23, 2007 || Catalina || CSS || H || align=right data-sort-value="0.60" | 600 m || 
|-id=243 bgcolor=#E9E9E9
| 373243 ||  || — || March 24, 2003 || Kitt Peak || Spacewatch || — || align=right | 2.3 km || 
|-id=244 bgcolor=#fefefe
| 373244 ||  || — || June 17, 2005 || Kitt Peak || Spacewatch || V || align=right data-sort-value="0.92" | 920 m || 
|-id=245 bgcolor=#fefefe
| 373245 ||  || — || March 27, 2008 || Mount Lemmon || Mount Lemmon Survey || V || align=right data-sort-value="0.89" | 890 m || 
|-id=246 bgcolor=#fefefe
| 373246 ||  || — || May 19, 2005 || Mount Lemmon || Mount Lemmon Survey || V || align=right data-sort-value="0.61" | 610 m || 
|-id=247 bgcolor=#E9E9E9
| 373247 ||  || — || March 29, 2012 || Mount Lemmon || Mount Lemmon Survey || — || align=right | 1.8 km || 
|-id=248 bgcolor=#fefefe
| 373248 ||  || — || November 3, 2010 || Mount Lemmon || Mount Lemmon Survey || NYS || align=right data-sort-value="0.65" | 650 m || 
|-id=249 bgcolor=#E9E9E9
| 373249 ||  || — || October 25, 2005 || Kitt Peak || Spacewatch || HEN || align=right | 1.1 km || 
|-id=250 bgcolor=#d6d6d6
| 373250 ||  || — || February 25, 2006 || Mount Lemmon || Mount Lemmon Survey || — || align=right | 2.5 km || 
|-id=251 bgcolor=#E9E9E9
| 373251 ||  || — || October 11, 2004 || Kitt Peak || Spacewatch || — || align=right | 2.3 km || 
|-id=252 bgcolor=#d6d6d6
| 373252 ||  || — || February 10, 2011 || Mount Lemmon || Mount Lemmon Survey || EOS || align=right | 2.3 km || 
|-id=253 bgcolor=#fefefe
| 373253 ||  || — || February 17, 2004 || Kitt Peak || Spacewatch || NYS || align=right data-sort-value="0.81" | 810 m || 
|-id=254 bgcolor=#fefefe
| 373254 ||  || — || October 20, 2003 || Kitt Peak || Spacewatch || FLO || align=right data-sort-value="0.76" | 760 m || 
|-id=255 bgcolor=#fefefe
| 373255 ||  || — || March 2, 2008 || Catalina || CSS || — || align=right | 1.1 km || 
|-id=256 bgcolor=#E9E9E9
| 373256 ||  || — || October 9, 2004 || Kitt Peak || Spacewatch || HNA || align=right | 3.3 km || 
|-id=257 bgcolor=#fefefe
| 373257 ||  || — || February 14, 2005 || Catalina || CSS || — || align=right | 1.2 km || 
|-id=258 bgcolor=#d6d6d6
| 373258 ||  || — || February 2, 2006 || Kitt Peak || Spacewatch || — || align=right | 2.8 km || 
|-id=259 bgcolor=#E9E9E9
| 373259 ||  || — || May 29, 1995 || Kitt Peak || Spacewatch || — || align=right | 1.7 km || 
|-id=260 bgcolor=#E9E9E9
| 373260 ||  || — || February 10, 2002 || Socorro || LINEAR || — || align=right | 2.6 km || 
|-id=261 bgcolor=#d6d6d6
| 373261 ||  || — || May 10, 2007 || Mount Lemmon || Mount Lemmon Survey || — || align=right | 2.5 km || 
|-id=262 bgcolor=#d6d6d6
| 373262 ||  || — || January 13, 2011 || Kitt Peak || Spacewatch || — || align=right | 3.3 km || 
|-id=263 bgcolor=#E9E9E9
| 373263 ||  || — || January 8, 2002 || Kitt Peak || Spacewatch || — || align=right | 2.0 km || 
|-id=264 bgcolor=#fefefe
| 373264 ||  || — || November 11, 2007 || Mount Lemmon || Mount Lemmon Survey || NYS || align=right data-sort-value="0.74" | 740 m || 
|-id=265 bgcolor=#fefefe
| 373265 ||  || — || January 17, 2005 || Kitt Peak || Spacewatch || — || align=right data-sort-value="0.66" | 660 m || 
|-id=266 bgcolor=#E9E9E9
| 373266 ||  || — || June 29, 2004 || Siding Spring || SSS || ADE || align=right | 2.3 km || 
|-id=267 bgcolor=#d6d6d6
| 373267 ||  || — || May 15, 1996 || Kitt Peak || Spacewatch || — || align=right | 3.3 km || 
|-id=268 bgcolor=#d6d6d6
| 373268 ||  || — || February 23, 2006 || Anderson Mesa || LONEOS || — || align=right | 4.6 km || 
|-id=269 bgcolor=#d6d6d6
| 373269 ||  || — || February 16, 2001 || Socorro || LINEAR || — || align=right | 4.6 km || 
|-id=270 bgcolor=#d6d6d6
| 373270 ||  || — || December 12, 2004 || Campo Imperatore || CINEOS || EOS || align=right | 2.4 km || 
|-id=271 bgcolor=#fefefe
| 373271 ||  || — || October 20, 2007 || Mount Lemmon || Mount Lemmon Survey || — || align=right data-sort-value="0.67" | 670 m || 
|-id=272 bgcolor=#fefefe
| 373272 ||  || — || October 8, 1999 || Kitt Peak || Spacewatch || V || align=right data-sort-value="0.69" | 690 m || 
|-id=273 bgcolor=#d6d6d6
| 373273 ||  || — || March 11, 2007 || Mount Lemmon || Mount Lemmon Survey || KOR || align=right | 1.2 km || 
|-id=274 bgcolor=#E9E9E9
| 373274 ||  || — || May 5, 2008 || Mount Lemmon || Mount Lemmon Survey || — || align=right | 1.4 km || 
|-id=275 bgcolor=#E9E9E9
| 373275 ||  || — || December 26, 2006 || Kitt Peak || Spacewatch || MIS || align=right | 3.0 km || 
|-id=276 bgcolor=#E9E9E9
| 373276 ||  || — || April 11, 1999 || Kitt Peak || Spacewatch || — || align=right | 1.3 km || 
|-id=277 bgcolor=#fefefe
| 373277 ||  || — || December 4, 2007 || Kitt Peak || Spacewatch || — || align=right data-sort-value="0.78" | 780 m || 
|-id=278 bgcolor=#d6d6d6
| 373278 ||  || — || February 2, 2006 || Mount Lemmon || Mount Lemmon Survey || TIR || align=right | 4.2 km || 
|-id=279 bgcolor=#E9E9E9
| 373279 ||  || — || September 3, 2008 || Kitt Peak || Spacewatch || CLO || align=right | 2.9 km || 
|-id=280 bgcolor=#E9E9E9
| 373280 ||  || — || April 30, 2008 || Catalina || CSS || — || align=right | 3.7 km || 
|-id=281 bgcolor=#E9E9E9
| 373281 ||  || — || November 3, 2010 || Mount Lemmon || Mount Lemmon Survey || — || align=right | 2.6 km || 
|-id=282 bgcolor=#E9E9E9
| 373282 ||  || — || November 1, 2005 || Mount Lemmon || Mount Lemmon Survey || — || align=right | 1.8 km || 
|-id=283 bgcolor=#d6d6d6
| 373283 ||  || — || September 29, 2008 || Catalina || CSS || — || align=right | 4.3 km || 
|-id=284 bgcolor=#d6d6d6
| 373284 ||  || — || June 16, 2001 || Kitt Peak || Spacewatch || VER || align=right | 2.4 km || 
|-id=285 bgcolor=#E9E9E9
| 373285 ||  || — || June 7, 2008 || Kitt Peak || Spacewatch || — || align=right | 2.9 km || 
|-id=286 bgcolor=#d6d6d6
| 373286 ||  || — || May 13, 2007 || Mount Lemmon || Mount Lemmon Survey || EOS || align=right | 2.0 km || 
|-id=287 bgcolor=#E9E9E9
| 373287 ||  || — || September 7, 2004 || Kitt Peak || Spacewatch || — || align=right | 2.2 km || 
|-id=288 bgcolor=#E9E9E9
| 373288 ||  || — || March 11, 2007 || Kitt Peak || Spacewatch || GEF || align=right | 1.5 km || 
|-id=289 bgcolor=#d6d6d6
| 373289 ||  || — || October 19, 2003 || Kitt Peak || Spacewatch || — || align=right | 3.5 km || 
|-id=290 bgcolor=#d6d6d6
| 373290 ||  || — || September 6, 2008 || Kitt Peak || Spacewatch || — || align=right | 2.5 km || 
|-id=291 bgcolor=#d6d6d6
| 373291 ||  || — || January 23, 2006 || Kitt Peak || Spacewatch || — || align=right | 3.8 km || 
|-id=292 bgcolor=#fefefe
| 373292 ||  || — || October 14, 2010 || Mount Lemmon || Mount Lemmon Survey || — || align=right data-sort-value="0.77" | 770 m || 
|-id=293 bgcolor=#E9E9E9
| 373293 ||  || — || April 24, 1995 || Kitt Peak || Spacewatch || — || align=right | 1.5 km || 
|-id=294 bgcolor=#E9E9E9
| 373294 ||  || — || January 16, 2007 || Mount Lemmon || Mount Lemmon Survey || — || align=right | 1.2 km || 
|-id=295 bgcolor=#d6d6d6
| 373295 ||  || — || March 26, 2007 || Kitt Peak || Spacewatch || — || align=right | 2.5 km || 
|-id=296 bgcolor=#E9E9E9
| 373296 ||  || — || October 25, 2005 || Mount Lemmon || Mount Lemmon Survey || — || align=right | 1.3 km || 
|-id=297 bgcolor=#E9E9E9
| 373297 ||  || — || August 28, 1995 || Kitt Peak || Spacewatch || — || align=right | 2.0 km || 
|-id=298 bgcolor=#d6d6d6
| 373298 ||  || — || May 13, 2007 || Mount Lemmon || Mount Lemmon Survey || — || align=right | 3.4 km || 
|-id=299 bgcolor=#E9E9E9
| 373299 ||  || — || January 10, 2011 || Mount Lemmon || Mount Lemmon Survey || — || align=right | 2.1 km || 
|-id=300 bgcolor=#E9E9E9
| 373300 ||  || — || November 6, 1999 || Kitt Peak || Spacewatch || — || align=right | 3.0 km || 
|}

373301–373400 

|-bgcolor=#E9E9E9
| 373301 ||  || — || March 16, 2012 || Kitt Peak || Spacewatch || — || align=right | 1.6 km || 
|-id=302 bgcolor=#E9E9E9
| 373302 ||  || — || September 18, 1995 || Kitt Peak || Spacewatch || — || align=right | 1.9 km || 
|-id=303 bgcolor=#d6d6d6
| 373303 ||  || — || December 26, 2009 || Kitt Peak || Spacewatch || EOS || align=right | 7.0 km || 
|-id=304 bgcolor=#fefefe
| 373304 ||  || — || March 23, 2004 || Kitt Peak || Spacewatch || — || align=right | 1.1 km || 
|-id=305 bgcolor=#E9E9E9
| 373305 ||  || — || February 23, 2007 || Catalina || CSS || PAL || align=right | 1.9 km || 
|-id=306 bgcolor=#E9E9E9
| 373306 ||  || — || April 7, 1999 || Anderson Mesa || LONEOS || — || align=right | 2.5 km || 
|-id=307 bgcolor=#E9E9E9
| 373307 ||  || — || May 5, 2008 || Mount Lemmon || Mount Lemmon Survey || — || align=right data-sort-value="0.85" | 850 m || 
|-id=308 bgcolor=#d6d6d6
| 373308 ||  || — || September 27, 2008 || Mount Lemmon || Mount Lemmon Survey || HYG || align=right | 3.8 km || 
|-id=309 bgcolor=#E9E9E9
| 373309 ||  || — || October 23, 2009 || Mount Lemmon || Mount Lemmon Survey || — || align=right | 2.9 km || 
|-id=310 bgcolor=#E9E9E9
| 373310 ||  || — || October 24, 2005 || Kitt Peak || Spacewatch || — || align=right | 1.5 km || 
|-id=311 bgcolor=#E9E9E9
| 373311 ||  || — || April 26, 2008 || Mount Lemmon || Mount Lemmon Survey || — || align=right | 1.0 km || 
|-id=312 bgcolor=#fefefe
| 373312 ||  || — || October 2, 2006 || Mount Lemmon || Mount Lemmon Survey || — || align=right data-sort-value="0.87" | 870 m || 
|-id=313 bgcolor=#E9E9E9
| 373313 ||  || — || October 5, 2004 || Kitt Peak || Spacewatch || — || align=right | 2.2 km || 
|-id=314 bgcolor=#E9E9E9
| 373314 ||  || — || January 11, 2011 || Catalina || CSS || — || align=right | 1.4 km || 
|-id=315 bgcolor=#E9E9E9
| 373315 ||  || — || March 10, 2007 || Mount Lemmon || Mount Lemmon Survey || — || align=right | 1.4 km || 
|-id=316 bgcolor=#E9E9E9
| 373316 ||  || — || October 27, 2009 || Kitt Peak || Spacewatch || — || align=right | 3.0 km || 
|-id=317 bgcolor=#d6d6d6
| 373317 ||  || — || November 9, 2009 || Mount Lemmon || Mount Lemmon Survey || EOS || align=right | 2.5 km || 
|-id=318 bgcolor=#E9E9E9
| 373318 ||  || — || December 2, 2005 || Kitt Peak || Spacewatch || AGN || align=right | 1.7 km || 
|-id=319 bgcolor=#d6d6d6
| 373319 ||  || — || September 27, 2008 || Mount Lemmon || Mount Lemmon Survey || — || align=right | 3.4 km || 
|-id=320 bgcolor=#E9E9E9
| 373320 ||  || — || October 27, 2005 || Kitt Peak || Spacewatch || — || align=right | 1.9 km || 
|-id=321 bgcolor=#d6d6d6
| 373321 ||  || — || April 19, 2007 || Kitt Peak || Spacewatch || KOR || align=right | 1.3 km || 
|-id=322 bgcolor=#E9E9E9
| 373322 ||  || — || November 23, 2006 || Kitt Peak || Spacewatch || — || align=right | 1.1 km || 
|-id=323 bgcolor=#E9E9E9
| 373323 ||  || — || September 10, 2004 || Kitt Peak || Spacewatch || MRX || align=right | 1.2 km || 
|-id=324 bgcolor=#d6d6d6
| 373324 ||  || — || August 8, 2007 || Socorro || LINEAR || — || align=right | 5.4 km || 
|-id=325 bgcolor=#E9E9E9
| 373325 ||  || — || August 8, 2004 || Socorro || LINEAR || — || align=right | 1.8 km || 
|-id=326 bgcolor=#E9E9E9
| 373326 ||  || — || November 21, 2005 || Kitt Peak || Spacewatch || — || align=right | 1.6 km || 
|-id=327 bgcolor=#E9E9E9
| 373327 ||  || — || January 17, 2007 || Kitt Peak || Spacewatch || — || align=right | 1.6 km || 
|-id=328 bgcolor=#E9E9E9
| 373328 ||  || — || August 31, 2005 || Kitt Peak || Spacewatch || — || align=right | 1.5 km || 
|-id=329 bgcolor=#E9E9E9
| 373329 ||  || — || December 1, 2005 || Kitt Peak || Spacewatch || ADE || align=right | 2.4 km || 
|-id=330 bgcolor=#E9E9E9
| 373330 ||  || — || December 10, 2001 || Kitt Peak || Spacewatch || EUN || align=right | 1.7 km || 
|-id=331 bgcolor=#E9E9E9
| 373331 ||  || — || April 19, 1999 || Kitt Peak || Spacewatch || MAR || align=right | 1.5 km || 
|-id=332 bgcolor=#d6d6d6
| 373332 ||  || — || February 27, 2006 || Mount Lemmon || Mount Lemmon Survey || — || align=right | 2.9 km || 
|-id=333 bgcolor=#d6d6d6
| 373333 ||  || — || March 14, 2007 || Mount Lemmon || Mount Lemmon Survey || — || align=right | 2.8 km || 
|-id=334 bgcolor=#E9E9E9
| 373334 ||  || — || December 24, 2005 || Kitt Peak || Spacewatch || HOF || align=right | 2.9 km || 
|-id=335 bgcolor=#E9E9E9
| 373335 ||  || — || October 6, 2004 || Kitt Peak || Spacewatch || AGN || align=right | 1.2 km || 
|-id=336 bgcolor=#E9E9E9
| 373336 ||  || — || November 9, 2009 || Mount Lemmon || Mount Lemmon Survey || — || align=right | 2.0 km || 
|-id=337 bgcolor=#E9E9E9
| 373337 ||  || — || November 22, 2005 || Kitt Peak || Spacewatch || — || align=right | 1.1 km || 
|-id=338 bgcolor=#E9E9E9
| 373338 ||  || — || January 22, 2006 || Mount Lemmon || Mount Lemmon Survey || XIZ || align=right | 1.6 km || 
|-id=339 bgcolor=#d6d6d6
| 373339 ||  || — || December 30, 2005 || Kitt Peak || Spacewatch || BRA || align=right | 1.4 km || 
|-id=340 bgcolor=#E9E9E9
| 373340 ||  || — || March 28, 1993 || Kitt Peak || Spacewatch || — || align=right | 2.1 km || 
|-id=341 bgcolor=#d6d6d6
| 373341 ||  || — || September 20, 2008 || Mount Lemmon || Mount Lemmon Survey || — || align=right | 1.8 km || 
|-id=342 bgcolor=#E9E9E9
| 373342 ||  || — || October 24, 2005 || Kitt Peak || Spacewatch || — || align=right | 1.4 km || 
|-id=343 bgcolor=#E9E9E9
| 373343 ||  || — || January 8, 2011 || Mount Lemmon || Mount Lemmon Survey || — || align=right | 1.3 km || 
|-id=344 bgcolor=#d6d6d6
| 373344 ||  || — || May 16, 2007 || Kitt Peak || Spacewatch || — || align=right | 3.2 km || 
|-id=345 bgcolor=#E9E9E9
| 373345 ||  || — || November 25, 2005 || Mount Lemmon || Mount Lemmon Survey || HEN || align=right | 1.0 km || 
|-id=346 bgcolor=#E9E9E9
| 373346 ||  || — || December 25, 2005 || Kitt Peak || Spacewatch || — || align=right | 2.4 km || 
|-id=347 bgcolor=#E9E9E9
| 373347 ||  || — || December 12, 2006 || Kitt Peak || Spacewatch || — || align=right | 1.0 km || 
|-id=348 bgcolor=#fefefe
| 373348 ||  || — || November 15, 2007 || Mount Lemmon || Mount Lemmon Survey || FLO || align=right data-sort-value="0.67" | 670 m || 
|-id=349 bgcolor=#d6d6d6
| 373349 ||  || — || September 3, 2008 || Kitt Peak || Spacewatch || — || align=right | 2.7 km || 
|-id=350 bgcolor=#E9E9E9
| 373350 ||  || — || March 24, 2003 || Kitt Peak || Spacewatch || — || align=right | 1.5 km || 
|-id=351 bgcolor=#E9E9E9
| 373351 ||  || — || May 6, 2008 || Mount Lemmon || Mount Lemmon Survey || — || align=right | 1.2 km || 
|-id=352 bgcolor=#d6d6d6
| 373352 ||  || — || October 14, 2009 || Mount Lemmon || Mount Lemmon Survey || — || align=right | 3.2 km || 
|-id=353 bgcolor=#d6d6d6
| 373353 ||  || — || February 8, 2000 || Kitt Peak || Spacewatch || — || align=right | 3.3 km || 
|-id=354 bgcolor=#E9E9E9
| 373354 ||  || — || February 26, 2007 || Mount Lemmon || Mount Lemmon Survey || — || align=right | 2.2 km || 
|-id=355 bgcolor=#fefefe
| 373355 ||  || — || March 1, 2008 || Kitt Peak || Spacewatch || V || align=right data-sort-value="0.82" | 820 m || 
|-id=356 bgcolor=#E9E9E9
| 373356 ||  || — || July 29, 2008 || Mount Lemmon || Mount Lemmon Survey || HOF || align=right | 2.6 km || 
|-id=357 bgcolor=#E9E9E9
| 373357 ||  || — || November 29, 2005 || Kitt Peak || Spacewatch || — || align=right | 1.7 km || 
|-id=358 bgcolor=#E9E9E9
| 373358 ||  || — || November 27, 2009 || Kitt Peak || Spacewatch || MRX || align=right | 1.3 km || 
|-id=359 bgcolor=#E9E9E9
| 373359 ||  || — || April 29, 2003 || Kitt Peak || Spacewatch || GEF || align=right data-sort-value="0.94" | 940 m || 
|-id=360 bgcolor=#E9E9E9
| 373360 ||  || — || September 5, 1999 || Kitt Peak || Spacewatch || WIT || align=right | 1.4 km || 
|-id=361 bgcolor=#E9E9E9
| 373361 ||  || — || January 10, 2006 || Mount Lemmon || Mount Lemmon Survey || — || align=right | 2.3 km || 
|-id=362 bgcolor=#d6d6d6
| 373362 ||  || — || January 22, 2006 || Mount Lemmon || Mount Lemmon Survey || — || align=right | 3.1 km || 
|-id=363 bgcolor=#E9E9E9
| 373363 ||  || — || December 15, 2001 || Socorro || LINEAR || — || align=right | 2.2 km || 
|-id=364 bgcolor=#E9E9E9
| 373364 ||  || — || September 30, 2005 || Kitt Peak || Spacewatch || — || align=right | 1.0 km || 
|-id=365 bgcolor=#E9E9E9
| 373365 ||  || — || February 23, 2007 || Kitt Peak || Spacewatch || — || align=right | 1.4 km || 
|-id=366 bgcolor=#d6d6d6
| 373366 ||  || — || March 24, 2006 || Mount Lemmon || Mount Lemmon Survey || THM || align=right | 2.5 km || 
|-id=367 bgcolor=#d6d6d6
| 373367 ||  || — || September 15, 2007 || Mount Lemmon || Mount Lemmon Survey || — || align=right | 3.2 km || 
|-id=368 bgcolor=#d6d6d6
| 373368 ||  || — || October 9, 2008 || Catalina || CSS || — || align=right | 4.0 km || 
|-id=369 bgcolor=#d6d6d6
| 373369 ||  || — || December 11, 2004 || Kitt Peak || Spacewatch || — || align=right | 3.9 km || 
|-id=370 bgcolor=#d6d6d6
| 373370 ||  || — || June 4, 1995 || Kitt Peak || Spacewatch || VER || align=right | 3.3 km || 
|-id=371 bgcolor=#E9E9E9
| 373371 ||  || — || October 1, 2005 || Mount Lemmon || Mount Lemmon Survey || — || align=right | 1.3 km || 
|-id=372 bgcolor=#d6d6d6
| 373372 ||  || — || September 28, 1994 || Kitt Peak || Spacewatch || CHA || align=right | 2.1 km || 
|-id=373 bgcolor=#fefefe
| 373373 ||  || — || February 13, 2004 || Kitt Peak || Spacewatch || V || align=right data-sort-value="0.76" | 760 m || 
|-id=374 bgcolor=#E9E9E9
| 373374 ||  || — || April 11, 2007 || Kitt Peak || Spacewatch || NEM || align=right | 2.3 km || 
|-id=375 bgcolor=#d6d6d6
| 373375 ||  || — || September 16, 2003 || Kitt Peak || Spacewatch || KOR || align=right | 1.5 km || 
|-id=376 bgcolor=#d6d6d6
| 373376 ||  || — || June 23, 2007 || Kitt Peak || Spacewatch || — || align=right | 3.8 km || 
|-id=377 bgcolor=#E9E9E9
| 373377 ||  || — || January 25, 2011 || Kitt Peak || Spacewatch || — || align=right | 3.4 km || 
|-id=378 bgcolor=#d6d6d6
| 373378 ||  || — || February 27, 2006 || Kitt Peak || Spacewatch || 7:4 || align=right | 3.7 km || 
|-id=379 bgcolor=#d6d6d6
| 373379 ||  || — || January 7, 2010 || Mount Lemmon || Mount Lemmon Survey || — || align=right | 4.5 km || 
|-id=380 bgcolor=#E9E9E9
| 373380 ||  || — || September 26, 2005 || Kitt Peak || Spacewatch || — || align=right | 1.2 km || 
|-id=381 bgcolor=#C2FFFF
| 373381 ||  || — || March 30, 2010 || WISE || WISE || L5 || align=right | 14 km || 
|-id=382 bgcolor=#d6d6d6
| 373382 ||  || — || September 18, 2001 || Kitt Peak || Spacewatch || EOS || align=right | 2.4 km || 
|-id=383 bgcolor=#d6d6d6
| 373383 ||  || — || August 28, 2006 || Catalina || CSS || — || align=right | 3.8 km || 
|-id=384 bgcolor=#fefefe
| 373384 ||  || — || September 28, 2003 || Kitt Peak || Spacewatch || V || align=right data-sort-value="0.78" | 780 m || 
|-id=385 bgcolor=#d6d6d6
| 373385 ||  || — || April 24, 1996 || Kitt Peak || Spacewatch || VER || align=right | 4.7 km || 
|-id=386 bgcolor=#E9E9E9
| 373386 ||  || — || February 1, 2006 || Mount Lemmon || Mount Lemmon Survey || — || align=right | 3.3 km || 
|-id=387 bgcolor=#E9E9E9
| 373387 ||  || — || September 18, 2009 || Catalina || CSS || EUN || align=right | 2.1 km || 
|-id=388 bgcolor=#fefefe
| 373388 ||  || — || September 17, 2006 || Kitt Peak || Spacewatch || V || align=right data-sort-value="0.48" | 480 m || 
|-id=389 bgcolor=#fefefe
| 373389 ||  || — || February 2, 2005 || Kitt Peak || Spacewatch || PHO || align=right | 1.5 km || 
|-id=390 bgcolor=#d6d6d6
| 373390 ||  || — || October 5, 2004 || Kitt Peak || Spacewatch || ITH || align=right | 1.6 km || 
|-id=391 bgcolor=#fefefe
| 373391 ||  || — || March 8, 2005 || Kitt Peak || Spacewatch || V || align=right data-sort-value="0.75" | 750 m || 
|-id=392 bgcolor=#d6d6d6
| 373392 ||  || — || June 19, 2007 || Kitt Peak || Spacewatch || VER || align=right | 3.1 km || 
|-id=393 bgcolor=#FFC2E0
| 373393 || 1972 RB || — || September 16, 1972 || Palomar || T. Gehrels || AMO || align=right data-sort-value="0.52" | 520 m || 
|-id=394 bgcolor=#fefefe
| 373394 ||  || — || October 10, 1990 || Tautenburg Observatory || F. Börngen, L. D. Schmadel || — || align=right | 1.1 km || 
|-id=395 bgcolor=#d6d6d6
| 373395 ||  || — || October 9, 1993 || Kitt Peak || Spacewatch || — || align=right | 3.2 km || 
|-id=396 bgcolor=#E9E9E9
| 373396 ||  || — || September 28, 1994 || Kitt Peak || Spacewatch || — || align=right | 2.9 km || 
|-id=397 bgcolor=#d6d6d6
| 373397 ||  || — || May 26, 1995 || Kitt Peak || Spacewatch || — || align=right | 3.1 km || 
|-id=398 bgcolor=#fefefe
| 373398 ||  || — || September 17, 1995 || Kitt Peak || Spacewatch || — || align=right data-sort-value="0.66" | 660 m || 
|-id=399 bgcolor=#E9E9E9
| 373399 ||  || — || September 19, 1995 || Kitt Peak || Spacewatch || — || align=right | 1.5 km || 
|-id=400 bgcolor=#fefefe
| 373400 ||  || — || September 20, 1995 || Kitt Peak || Spacewatch || MAS || align=right data-sort-value="0.68" | 680 m || 
|}

373401–373500 

|-bgcolor=#E9E9E9
| 373401 ||  || — || September 26, 1995 || Kitt Peak || Spacewatch || — || align=right | 1.8 km || 
|-id=402 bgcolor=#E9E9E9
| 373402 ||  || — || October 15, 1995 || Kitt Peak || Spacewatch || MRX || align=right data-sort-value="0.96" | 960 m || 
|-id=403 bgcolor=#d6d6d6
| 373403 ||  || — || October 26, 1995 || Kitt Peak || Spacewatch || 7:4 || align=right | 4.7 km || 
|-id=404 bgcolor=#E9E9E9
| 373404 ||  || — || November 15, 1995 || Kitt Peak || Spacewatch || — || align=right | 2.6 km || 
|-id=405 bgcolor=#fefefe
| 373405 ||  || — || November 17, 1995 || Kitt Peak || Spacewatch || V || align=right data-sort-value="0.70" | 700 m || 
|-id=406 bgcolor=#E9E9E9
| 373406 ||  || — || September 11, 1996 || Kitt Peak || Spacewatch || — || align=right | 1.3 km || 
|-id=407 bgcolor=#E9E9E9
| 373407 ||  || — || January 3, 1997 || Kitt Peak || Spacewatch || ADE || align=right | 3.4 km || 
|-id=408 bgcolor=#fefefe
| 373408 ||  || — || March 8, 1997 || Kitt Peak || Spacewatch || — || align=right data-sort-value="0.91" | 910 m || 
|-id=409 bgcolor=#E9E9E9
| 373409 ||  || — || March 4, 1997 || Kitt Peak || Spacewatch || — || align=right | 3.4 km || 
|-id=410 bgcolor=#d6d6d6
| 373410 ||  || — || September 6, 1997 || Caussols || ODAS || — || align=right | 2.4 km || 
|-id=411 bgcolor=#d6d6d6
| 373411 ||  || — || September 28, 1997 || Kitt Peak || Spacewatch || — || align=right | 3.3 km || 
|-id=412 bgcolor=#d6d6d6
| 373412 ||  || — || September 28, 1997 || Kitt Peak || Spacewatch || — || align=right | 2.6 km || 
|-id=413 bgcolor=#d6d6d6
| 373413 ||  || — || October 3, 1997 || Kitt Peak || Spacewatch || — || align=right | 2.4 km || 
|-id=414 bgcolor=#E9E9E9
| 373414 ||  || — || April 18, 1998 || Socorro || LINEAR || BAR || align=right | 1.5 km || 
|-id=415 bgcolor=#E9E9E9
| 373415 ||  || — || April 21, 1998 || Kitt Peak || Spacewatch || — || align=right | 1.3 km || 
|-id=416 bgcolor=#FA8072
| 373416 ||  || — || August 17, 1998 || Socorro || LINEAR || — || align=right data-sort-value="0.82" | 820 m || 
|-id=417 bgcolor=#d6d6d6
| 373417 ||  || — || September 23, 1998 || Kitt Peak || Spacewatch || KOR || align=right | 1.5 km || 
|-id=418 bgcolor=#fefefe
| 373418 ||  || — || October 13, 1998 || Kitt Peak || Spacewatch || — || align=right data-sort-value="0.83" | 830 m || 
|-id=419 bgcolor=#fefefe
| 373419 ||  || — || October 14, 1998 || Xinglong || SCAP || — || align=right data-sort-value="0.97" | 970 m || 
|-id=420 bgcolor=#d6d6d6
| 373420 ||  || — || December 10, 1998 || Kitt Peak || Spacewatch || — || align=right | 4.2 km || 
|-id=421 bgcolor=#E9E9E9
| 373421 ||  || — || December 15, 1998 || Caussols || ODAS || — || align=right | 1.3 km || 
|-id=422 bgcolor=#E9E9E9
| 373422 ||  || — || February 12, 1999 || Socorro || LINEAR || — || align=right | 1.5 km || 
|-id=423 bgcolor=#d6d6d6
| 373423 ||  || — || February 11, 1999 || Socorro || LINEAR || — || align=right | 3.8 km || 
|-id=424 bgcolor=#E9E9E9
| 373424 ||  || — || June 9, 1999 || Kitt Peak || Spacewatch || JUN || align=right | 1.2 km || 
|-id=425 bgcolor=#FA8072
| 373425 ||  || — || June 20, 1999 || Anderson Mesa || LONEOS || — || align=right | 1.0 km || 
|-id=426 bgcolor=#E9E9E9
| 373426 ||  || — || September 14, 1999 || Kitt Peak || Spacewatch || WIT || align=right data-sort-value="0.85" | 850 m || 
|-id=427 bgcolor=#E9E9E9
| 373427 ||  || — || September 7, 1999 || Catalina || CSS || DOR || align=right | 3.4 km || 
|-id=428 bgcolor=#FFC2E0
| 373428 ||  || — || October 4, 1999 || Catalina || CSS || APO || align=right data-sort-value="0.67" | 670 m || 
|-id=429 bgcolor=#E9E9E9
| 373429 ||  || — || October 3, 1999 || Kitt Peak || Spacewatch || AGN || align=right | 1.3 km || 
|-id=430 bgcolor=#fefefe
| 373430 ||  || — || October 7, 1999 || Kitt Peak || Spacewatch || V || align=right data-sort-value="0.54" | 540 m || 
|-id=431 bgcolor=#E9E9E9
| 373431 ||  || — || October 7, 1999 || Kitt Peak || Spacewatch || AGN || align=right | 1.3 km || 
|-id=432 bgcolor=#fefefe
| 373432 ||  || — || October 9, 1999 || Kitt Peak || Spacewatch || FLO || align=right data-sort-value="0.82" | 820 m || 
|-id=433 bgcolor=#fefefe
| 373433 ||  || — || October 13, 1999 || Kitt Peak || Spacewatch || — || align=right data-sort-value="0.81" | 810 m || 
|-id=434 bgcolor=#fefefe
| 373434 ||  || — || October 4, 1999 || Socorro || LINEAR || — || align=right | 1.0 km || 
|-id=435 bgcolor=#E9E9E9
| 373435 ||  || — || October 4, 1999 || Socorro || LINEAR || — || align=right | 3.0 km || 
|-id=436 bgcolor=#fefefe
| 373436 ||  || — || October 8, 1999 || Socorro || LINEAR || — || align=right data-sort-value="0.81" | 810 m || 
|-id=437 bgcolor=#fefefe
| 373437 ||  || — || October 10, 1999 || Socorro || LINEAR || — || align=right data-sort-value="0.70" | 700 m || 
|-id=438 bgcolor=#fefefe
| 373438 ||  || — || October 10, 1999 || Socorro || LINEAR || — || align=right data-sort-value="0.86" | 860 m || 
|-id=439 bgcolor=#E9E9E9
| 373439 ||  || — || October 3, 1999 || Kitt Peak || Spacewatch || — || align=right | 2.0 km || 
|-id=440 bgcolor=#fefefe
| 373440 ||  || — || October 13, 1999 || Kitt Peak || Spacewatch || NYS || align=right data-sort-value="0.71" | 710 m || 
|-id=441 bgcolor=#fefefe
| 373441 ||  || — || October 10, 1999 || Socorro || LINEAR || — || align=right data-sort-value="0.81" | 810 m || 
|-id=442 bgcolor=#E9E9E9
| 373442 ||  || — || October 13, 1999 || Apache Point || SDSS || — || align=right | 2.3 km || 
|-id=443 bgcolor=#fefefe
| 373443 ||  || — || October 29, 1999 || Kitt Peak || Spacewatch || — || align=right data-sort-value="0.83" | 830 m || 
|-id=444 bgcolor=#E9E9E9
| 373444 ||  || — || October 30, 1999 || Kitt Peak || Spacewatch || AGN || align=right | 1.4 km || 
|-id=445 bgcolor=#fefefe
| 373445 ||  || — || October 31, 1999 || Kitt Peak || Spacewatch || FLO || align=right data-sort-value="0.61" | 610 m || 
|-id=446 bgcolor=#fefefe
| 373446 ||  || — || October 31, 1999 || Kitt Peak || Spacewatch || FLO || align=right data-sort-value="0.56" | 560 m || 
|-id=447 bgcolor=#fefefe
| 373447 ||  || — || November 4, 1999 || Socorro || LINEAR || PHO || align=right | 1.1 km || 
|-id=448 bgcolor=#fefefe
| 373448 ||  || — || November 4, 1999 || Kitt Peak || Spacewatch || NYS || align=right data-sort-value="0.58" | 580 m || 
|-id=449 bgcolor=#fefefe
| 373449 ||  || — || November 11, 1999 || Kitt Peak || Spacewatch || NYS || align=right data-sort-value="0.67" | 670 m || 
|-id=450 bgcolor=#E9E9E9
| 373450 ||  || — || November 30, 1999 || Kitt Peak || Spacewatch || — || align=right | 2.8 km || 
|-id=451 bgcolor=#fefefe
| 373451 ||  || — || December 13, 1999 || Kitt Peak || Spacewatch || NYS || align=right data-sort-value="0.63" | 630 m || 
|-id=452 bgcolor=#fefefe
| 373452 ||  || — || January 6, 2000 || Kitt Peak || Spacewatch || — || align=right data-sort-value="0.89" | 890 m || 
|-id=453 bgcolor=#fefefe
| 373453 ||  || — || February 29, 2000 || Socorro || LINEAR || — || align=right data-sort-value="0.92" | 920 m || 
|-id=454 bgcolor=#fefefe
| 373454 ||  || — || February 27, 2000 || Kitt Peak || Spacewatch || NYS || align=right data-sort-value="0.74" | 740 m || 
|-id=455 bgcolor=#fefefe
| 373455 ||  || — || March 3, 2000 || Kitt Peak || Spacewatch || MAS || align=right data-sort-value="0.74" | 740 m || 
|-id=456 bgcolor=#FA8072
| 373456 ||  || — || March 10, 2000 || Socorro || LINEAR || — || align=right | 1.5 km || 
|-id=457 bgcolor=#fefefe
| 373457 ||  || — || March 25, 2000 || Kitt Peak || Spacewatch || V || align=right data-sort-value="0.89" | 890 m || 
|-id=458 bgcolor=#fefefe
| 373458 ||  || — || March 30, 2000 || Kitt Peak || Spacewatch || — || align=right data-sort-value="0.78" | 780 m || 
|-id=459 bgcolor=#d6d6d6
| 373459 ||  || — || April 5, 2000 || Socorro || LINEAR || — || align=right | 3.7 km || 
|-id=460 bgcolor=#fefefe
| 373460 ||  || — || April 5, 2000 || Socorro || LINEAR || — || align=right data-sort-value="0.92" | 920 m || 
|-id=461 bgcolor=#d6d6d6
| 373461 ||  || — || May 2, 2000 || Fort Davis || T. L. Farnham || THM || align=right | 2.9 km || 
|-id=462 bgcolor=#E9E9E9
| 373462 ||  || — || July 7, 2000 || Socorro || LINEAR || — || align=right | 1.9 km || 
|-id=463 bgcolor=#FA8072
| 373463 ||  || — || August 1, 2000 || Socorro || LINEAR || — || align=right data-sort-value="0.74" | 740 m || 
|-id=464 bgcolor=#E9E9E9
| 373464 ||  || — || August 31, 2000 || Socorro || LINEAR || — || align=right | 3.5 km || 
|-id=465 bgcolor=#E9E9E9
| 373465 ||  || — || July 6, 2000 || Anderson Mesa || LONEOS || JUN || align=right | 1.3 km || 
|-id=466 bgcolor=#E9E9E9
| 373466 ||  || — || September 1, 2000 || Socorro || LINEAR || — || align=right | 1.4 km || 
|-id=467 bgcolor=#E9E9E9
| 373467 ||  || — || September 5, 2000 || Anderson Mesa || LONEOS || JUN || align=right | 1.3 km || 
|-id=468 bgcolor=#E9E9E9
| 373468 ||  || — || August 31, 2000 || Socorro || LINEAR || — || align=right | 1.9 km || 
|-id=469 bgcolor=#FA8072
| 373469 ||  || — || September 24, 2000 || Socorro || LINEAR || — || align=right | 1.7 km || 
|-id=470 bgcolor=#E9E9E9
| 373470 ||  || — || September 23, 2000 || Socorro || LINEAR || — || align=right | 1.9 km || 
|-id=471 bgcolor=#E9E9E9
| 373471 ||  || — || September 24, 2000 || Socorro || LINEAR || JUN || align=right | 1.2 km || 
|-id=472 bgcolor=#E9E9E9
| 373472 ||  || — || September 24, 2000 || Socorro || LINEAR || EUN || align=right | 1.8 km || 
|-id=473 bgcolor=#E9E9E9
| 373473 ||  || — || September 23, 2000 || Socorro || LINEAR || — || align=right | 2.1 km || 
|-id=474 bgcolor=#E9E9E9
| 373474 ||  || — || September 28, 2000 || Socorro || LINEAR || — || align=right | 1.8 km || 
|-id=475 bgcolor=#E9E9E9
| 373475 ||  || — || September 19, 2000 || Haleakala || NEAT || — || align=right | 1.6 km || 
|-id=476 bgcolor=#E9E9E9
| 373476 ||  || — || September 22, 2000 || Kitt Peak || Spacewatch || — || align=right | 1.9 km || 
|-id=477 bgcolor=#fefefe
| 373477 ||  || — || September 28, 2000 || Socorro || LINEAR || — || align=right data-sort-value="0.83" | 830 m || 
|-id=478 bgcolor=#E9E9E9
| 373478 ||  || — || September 24, 2000 || Socorro || LINEAR || — || align=right | 1.7 km || 
|-id=479 bgcolor=#E9E9E9
| 373479 ||  || — || September 27, 2000 || Socorro || LINEAR || — || align=right | 1.9 km || 
|-id=480 bgcolor=#E9E9E9
| 373480 ||  || — || September 30, 2000 || Socorro || LINEAR || GER || align=right | 1.5 km || 
|-id=481 bgcolor=#E9E9E9
| 373481 || 2000 TP || — || October 2, 2000 || Emerald Lane || L. Ball || JUN || align=right | 1.2 km || 
|-id=482 bgcolor=#E9E9E9
| 373482 ||  || — || October 1, 2000 || Socorro || LINEAR || JUN || align=right | 1.4 km || 
|-id=483 bgcolor=#E9E9E9
| 373483 ||  || — || October 6, 2000 || Anderson Mesa || LONEOS || RAF || align=right | 1.1 km || 
|-id=484 bgcolor=#fefefe
| 373484 ||  || — || October 24, 2000 || Socorro || LINEAR || H || align=right data-sort-value="0.63" | 630 m || 
|-id=485 bgcolor=#E9E9E9
| 373485 ||  || — || October 24, 2000 || Socorro || LINEAR || IAN || align=right | 1.0 km || 
|-id=486 bgcolor=#E9E9E9
| 373486 ||  || — || October 25, 2000 || Socorro || LINEAR || HNS || align=right | 2.3 km || 
|-id=487 bgcolor=#E9E9E9
| 373487 ||  || — || November 2, 2000 || Kitt Peak || Spacewatch || — || align=right | 1.6 km || 
|-id=488 bgcolor=#E9E9E9
| 373488 ||  || — || November 3, 2000 || Socorro || LINEAR || — || align=right | 2.8 km || 
|-id=489 bgcolor=#fefefe
| 373489 ||  || — || November 20, 2000 || Kitt Peak || Spacewatch || — || align=right data-sort-value="0.65" | 650 m || 
|-id=490 bgcolor=#E9E9E9
| 373490 ||  || — || November 20, 2000 || Socorro || LINEAR || — || align=right | 2.1 km || 
|-id=491 bgcolor=#E9E9E9
| 373491 ||  || — || November 19, 2000 || Socorro || LINEAR || — || align=right | 2.3 km || 
|-id=492 bgcolor=#E9E9E9
| 373492 ||  || — || November 20, 2000 || Socorro || LINEAR || — || align=right | 2.8 km || 
|-id=493 bgcolor=#E9E9E9
| 373493 ||  || — || November 20, 2000 || Socorro || LINEAR || — || align=right | 3.1 km || 
|-id=494 bgcolor=#E9E9E9
| 373494 ||  || — || November 18, 2000 || Anderson Mesa || LONEOS || EUN || align=right | 1.6 km || 
|-id=495 bgcolor=#E9E9E9
| 373495 ||  || — || December 1, 2000 || Kitt Peak || Spacewatch || EUN || align=right | 1.4 km || 
|-id=496 bgcolor=#E9E9E9
| 373496 ||  || — || December 4, 2000 || Socorro || LINEAR || — || align=right | 1.7 km || 
|-id=497 bgcolor=#E9E9E9
| 373497 ||  || — || December 4, 2000 || Socorro || LINEAR || — || align=right | 2.8 km || 
|-id=498 bgcolor=#fefefe
| 373498 ||  || — || December 21, 2000 || Eskridge || G. Hug || — || align=right | 1.1 km || 
|-id=499 bgcolor=#fefefe
| 373499 ||  || — || December 20, 2000 || Socorro || LINEAR || H || align=right data-sort-value="0.85" | 850 m || 
|-id=500 bgcolor=#fefefe
| 373500 ||  || — || December 28, 2000 || Haleakala || NEAT || H || align=right data-sort-value="0.67" | 670 m || 
|}

373501–373600 

|-bgcolor=#E9E9E9
| 373501 ||  || — || January 19, 2001 || Kitt Peak || Spacewatch || — || align=right | 2.7 km || 
|-id=502 bgcolor=#E9E9E9
| 373502 ||  || — || January 29, 2001 || Socorro || LINEAR || — || align=right | 3.6 km || 
|-id=503 bgcolor=#FFC2E0
| 373503 ||  || — || February 15, 2001 || Socorro || LINEAR || AMO || align=right data-sort-value="0.36" | 360 m || 
|-id=504 bgcolor=#fefefe
| 373504 ||  || — || March 15, 2001 || Haleakala || NEAT || — || align=right | 1.1 km || 
|-id=505 bgcolor=#fefefe
| 373505 ||  || — || March 19, 2001 || Anderson Mesa || LONEOS || — || align=right data-sort-value="0.81" | 810 m || 
|-id=506 bgcolor=#fefefe
| 373506 ||  || — || March 21, 2001 || Socorro || LINEAR || — || align=right | 1.1 km || 
|-id=507 bgcolor=#fefefe
| 373507 ||  || — || March 28, 2001 || Kitt Peak || Spacewatch || — || align=right data-sort-value="0.77" | 770 m || 
|-id=508 bgcolor=#d6d6d6
| 373508 ||  || — || May 22, 2001 || Socorro || LINEAR || Tj (2.96) || align=right | 3.5 km || 
|-id=509 bgcolor=#d6d6d6
| 373509 ||  || — || May 22, 2001 || Socorro || LINEAR || — || align=right | 4.1 km || 
|-id=510 bgcolor=#d6d6d6
| 373510 ||  || — || July 13, 2001 || Palomar || NEAT || THB || align=right | 4.9 km || 
|-id=511 bgcolor=#d6d6d6
| 373511 ||  || — || July 16, 2001 || Haleakala || NEAT || EUP || align=right | 4.9 km || 
|-id=512 bgcolor=#d6d6d6
| 373512 ||  || — || August 14, 2001 || Palomar || NEAT || — || align=right | 4.5 km || 
|-id=513 bgcolor=#fefefe
| 373513 ||  || — || September 7, 2001 || Socorro || LINEAR || — || align=right data-sort-value="0.73" | 730 m || 
|-id=514 bgcolor=#E9E9E9
| 373514 ||  || — || September 12, 2001 || Socorro || LINEAR || — || align=right data-sort-value="0.96" | 960 m || 
|-id=515 bgcolor=#fefefe
| 373515 ||  || — || September 11, 2001 || Anderson Mesa || LONEOS || — || align=right | 1.1 km || 
|-id=516 bgcolor=#d6d6d6
| 373516 ||  || — || September 12, 2001 || Socorro || LINEAR || EUP || align=right | 5.0 km || 
|-id=517 bgcolor=#fefefe
| 373517 ||  || — || September 8, 2001 || Anderson Mesa || LONEOS || — || align=right | 1.3 km || 
|-id=518 bgcolor=#d6d6d6
| 373518 ||  || — || September 16, 2001 || Socorro || LINEAR || — || align=right | 3.7 km || 
|-id=519 bgcolor=#E9E9E9
| 373519 ||  || — || September 16, 2001 || Socorro || LINEAR || MAR || align=right | 1.2 km || 
|-id=520 bgcolor=#E9E9E9
| 373520 ||  || — || September 16, 2001 || Socorro || LINEAR || — || align=right | 1.0 km || 
|-id=521 bgcolor=#d6d6d6
| 373521 ||  || — || September 17, 2001 || Socorro || LINEAR || — || align=right | 4.3 km || 
|-id=522 bgcolor=#E9E9E9
| 373522 ||  || — || September 17, 2001 || Socorro || LINEAR || — || align=right data-sort-value="0.99" | 990 m || 
|-id=523 bgcolor=#d6d6d6
| 373523 ||  || — || September 19, 2001 || Socorro || LINEAR || — || align=right | 3.1 km || 
|-id=524 bgcolor=#E9E9E9
| 373524 ||  || — || September 19, 2001 || Socorro || LINEAR || — || align=right data-sort-value="0.88" | 880 m || 
|-id=525 bgcolor=#d6d6d6
| 373525 ||  || — || September 19, 2001 || Socorro || LINEAR || THM || align=right | 2.9 km || 
|-id=526 bgcolor=#E9E9E9
| 373526 ||  || — || September 19, 2001 || Socorro || LINEAR || — || align=right data-sort-value="0.74" | 740 m || 
|-id=527 bgcolor=#d6d6d6
| 373527 ||  || — || September 19, 2001 || Socorro || LINEAR || — || align=right | 3.6 km || 
|-id=528 bgcolor=#E9E9E9
| 373528 ||  || — || September 19, 2001 || Socorro || LINEAR || — || align=right data-sort-value="0.87" | 870 m || 
|-id=529 bgcolor=#d6d6d6
| 373529 ||  || — || September 19, 2001 || Kitt Peak || Spacewatch || ALA || align=right | 3.7 km || 
|-id=530 bgcolor=#E9E9E9
| 373530 ||  || — || September 21, 2001 || Kitt Peak || Spacewatch || — || align=right data-sort-value="0.71" | 710 m || 
|-id=531 bgcolor=#E9E9E9
| 373531 ||  || — || September 20, 2001 || Socorro || LINEAR || — || align=right | 1.1 km || 
|-id=532 bgcolor=#E9E9E9
| 373532 ||  || — || September 26, 2001 || Socorro || LINEAR || — || align=right data-sort-value="0.68" | 680 m || 
|-id=533 bgcolor=#fefefe
| 373533 ||  || — || October 13, 2001 || Socorro || LINEAR || NYS || align=right data-sort-value="0.99" | 990 m || 
|-id=534 bgcolor=#E9E9E9
| 373534 ||  || — || October 15, 2001 || Socorro || LINEAR || — || align=right | 2.0 km || 
|-id=535 bgcolor=#E9E9E9
| 373535 ||  || — || October 15, 2001 || Socorro || LINEAR || — || align=right data-sort-value="0.99" | 990 m || 
|-id=536 bgcolor=#fefefe
| 373536 ||  || — || October 14, 2001 || Socorro || LINEAR || — || align=right | 1.2 km || 
|-id=537 bgcolor=#E9E9E9
| 373537 ||  || — || October 14, 2001 || Socorro || LINEAR || — || align=right | 1.0 km || 
|-id=538 bgcolor=#E9E9E9
| 373538 ||  || — || October 14, 2001 || Socorro || LINEAR || — || align=right data-sort-value="0.93" | 930 m || 
|-id=539 bgcolor=#E9E9E9
| 373539 ||  || — || October 15, 2001 || Palomar || NEAT || — || align=right | 1.4 km || 
|-id=540 bgcolor=#E9E9E9
| 373540 ||  || — || October 11, 2001 || Palomar || NEAT || — || align=right data-sort-value="0.73" | 730 m || 
|-id=541 bgcolor=#E9E9E9
| 373541 ||  || — || October 12, 2001 || Haleakala || NEAT || — || align=right | 1.2 km || 
|-id=542 bgcolor=#E9E9E9
| 373542 ||  || — || October 13, 2001 || Palomar || NEAT || — || align=right | 1.3 km || 
|-id=543 bgcolor=#C2FFFF
| 373543 ||  || — || October 14, 2001 || Apache Point || SDSS || L5 || align=right | 10 km || 
|-id=544 bgcolor=#E9E9E9
| 373544 ||  || — || October 18, 2001 || Socorro || LINEAR || — || align=right | 2.0 km || 
|-id=545 bgcolor=#E9E9E9
| 373545 ||  || — || October 18, 2001 || Palomar || NEAT || — || align=right data-sort-value="0.99" | 990 m || 
|-id=546 bgcolor=#E9E9E9
| 373546 ||  || — || October 17, 2001 || Socorro || LINEAR || — || align=right | 1.1 km || 
|-id=547 bgcolor=#E9E9E9
| 373547 ||  || — || October 22, 2001 || Socorro || LINEAR || — || align=right | 1.4 km || 
|-id=548 bgcolor=#E9E9E9
| 373548 ||  || — || October 22, 2001 || Socorro || LINEAR || — || align=right | 1.0 km || 
|-id=549 bgcolor=#d6d6d6
| 373549 ||  || — || October 23, 2001 || Socorro || LINEAR || 7:4 || align=right | 3.3 km || 
|-id=550 bgcolor=#E9E9E9
| 373550 ||  || — || October 23, 2001 || Socorro || LINEAR || — || align=right | 1.6 km || 
|-id=551 bgcolor=#E9E9E9
| 373551 ||  || — || October 21, 2001 || Socorro || LINEAR || — || align=right data-sort-value="0.90" | 900 m || 
|-id=552 bgcolor=#E9E9E9
| 373552 ||  || — || October 21, 2001 || Kitt Peak || Spacewatch || — || align=right | 1.2 km || 
|-id=553 bgcolor=#d6d6d6
| 373553 ||  || — || October 24, 2001 || Palomar || NEAT || — || align=right | 3.2 km || 
|-id=554 bgcolor=#E9E9E9
| 373554 ||  || — || October 16, 2001 || Palomar || NEAT || — || align=right | 1.0 km || 
|-id=555 bgcolor=#E9E9E9
| 373555 ||  || — || November 9, 2001 || Socorro || LINEAR || — || align=right | 1.7 km || 
|-id=556 bgcolor=#E9E9E9
| 373556 ||  || — || November 9, 2001 || Socorro || LINEAR || — || align=right | 1.2 km || 
|-id=557 bgcolor=#E9E9E9
| 373557 ||  || — || November 15, 2001 || Socorro || LINEAR || MAR || align=right | 1.2 km || 
|-id=558 bgcolor=#E9E9E9
| 373558 ||  || — || November 9, 2001 || Socorro || LINEAR || — || align=right | 1.00 km || 
|-id=559 bgcolor=#E9E9E9
| 373559 ||  || — || November 17, 2001 || Socorro || LINEAR || — || align=right data-sort-value="0.74" | 740 m || 
|-id=560 bgcolor=#E9E9E9
| 373560 ||  || — || November 17, 2001 || Socorro || LINEAR || — || align=right | 1.2 km || 
|-id=561 bgcolor=#E9E9E9
| 373561 ||  || — || November 17, 2001 || Socorro || LINEAR || — || align=right | 1.1 km || 
|-id=562 bgcolor=#E9E9E9
| 373562 ||  || — || November 19, 2001 || Socorro || LINEAR || — || align=right data-sort-value="0.76" | 760 m || 
|-id=563 bgcolor=#E9E9E9
| 373563 ||  || — || December 8, 2001 || Socorro || LINEAR || — || align=right | 1.6 km || 
|-id=564 bgcolor=#E9E9E9
| 373564 ||  || — || December 9, 2001 || Socorro || LINEAR || — || align=right | 1.6 km || 
|-id=565 bgcolor=#E9E9E9
| 373565 ||  || — || December 7, 2001 || Kitt Peak || Spacewatch || — || align=right | 2.0 km || 
|-id=566 bgcolor=#E9E9E9
| 373566 ||  || — || December 10, 2001 || Socorro || LINEAR || RAF || align=right | 3.2 km || 
|-id=567 bgcolor=#E9E9E9
| 373567 ||  || — || December 10, 2001 || Socorro || LINEAR || — || align=right | 1.4 km || 
|-id=568 bgcolor=#E9E9E9
| 373568 ||  || — || November 20, 2001 || Socorro || LINEAR || — || align=right | 1.4 km || 
|-id=569 bgcolor=#E9E9E9
| 373569 ||  || — || December 11, 2001 || Socorro || LINEAR || RAF || align=right | 1.1 km || 
|-id=570 bgcolor=#E9E9E9
| 373570 ||  || — || December 9, 2001 || Anderson Mesa || LONEOS || — || align=right data-sort-value="0.94" | 940 m || 
|-id=571 bgcolor=#E9E9E9
| 373571 ||  || — || December 25, 2001 || Ametlla de Mar || J. Nomen || JUN || align=right | 1.3 km || 
|-id=572 bgcolor=#E9E9E9
| 373572 ||  || — || December 17, 2001 || Socorro || LINEAR || — || align=right | 1.2 km || 
|-id=573 bgcolor=#d6d6d6
| 373573 ||  || — || November 21, 2001 || Socorro || LINEAR || 7:4 || align=right | 4.4 km || 
|-id=574 bgcolor=#E9E9E9
| 373574 ||  || — || December 18, 2001 || Socorro || LINEAR || — || align=right | 2.5 km || 
|-id=575 bgcolor=#E9E9E9
| 373575 ||  || — || December 18, 2001 || Socorro || LINEAR || — || align=right | 3.2 km || 
|-id=576 bgcolor=#E9E9E9
| 373576 ||  || — || December 18, 2001 || Socorro || LINEAR || RAF || align=right | 1.1 km || 
|-id=577 bgcolor=#E9E9E9
| 373577 ||  || — || December 18, 2001 || Socorro || LINEAR || — || align=right | 1.1 km || 
|-id=578 bgcolor=#E9E9E9
| 373578 ||  || — || December 19, 2001 || Socorro || LINEAR || — || align=right | 1.3 km || 
|-id=579 bgcolor=#FFC2E0
| 373579 ||  || — || January 9, 2002 || Socorro || LINEAR || APO || align=right data-sort-value="0.54" | 540 m || 
|-id=580 bgcolor=#E9E9E9
| 373580 ||  || — || January 9, 2002 || Socorro || LINEAR || — || align=right | 2.8 km || 
|-id=581 bgcolor=#E9E9E9
| 373581 ||  || — || January 9, 2002 || Socorro || LINEAR || — || align=right data-sort-value="0.95" | 950 m || 
|-id=582 bgcolor=#E9E9E9
| 373582 ||  || — || January 9, 2002 || Socorro || LINEAR || — || align=right | 1.1 km || 
|-id=583 bgcolor=#E9E9E9
| 373583 ||  || — || January 9, 2002 || Socorro || LINEAR || — || align=right | 4.0 km || 
|-id=584 bgcolor=#E9E9E9
| 373584 ||  || — || January 14, 2002 || Socorro || LINEAR || — || align=right | 1.1 km || 
|-id=585 bgcolor=#d6d6d6
| 373585 ||  || — || January 14, 2002 || Socorro || LINEAR || 7:4 || align=right | 4.9 km || 
|-id=586 bgcolor=#E9E9E9
| 373586 ||  || — || January 8, 2002 || Socorro || LINEAR || — || align=right data-sort-value="0.98" | 980 m || 
|-id=587 bgcolor=#E9E9E9
| 373587 ||  || — || January 12, 2002 || Kitt Peak || Spacewatch || — || align=right | 1.1 km || 
|-id=588 bgcolor=#fefefe
| 373588 ||  || — || February 6, 2002 || Socorro || LINEAR || H || align=right data-sort-value="0.71" | 710 m || 
|-id=589 bgcolor=#E9E9E9
| 373589 ||  || — || February 7, 2002 || Kingsnake || J. V. McClusky || JUN || align=right | 4.3 km || 
|-id=590 bgcolor=#E9E9E9
| 373590 ||  || — || February 6, 2002 || Socorro || LINEAR || EUN || align=right | 1.5 km || 
|-id=591 bgcolor=#E9E9E9
| 373591 ||  || — || February 7, 2002 || Socorro || LINEAR || — || align=right | 1.9 km || 
|-id=592 bgcolor=#FA8072
| 373592 ||  || — || February 13, 2002 || Socorro || LINEAR || H || align=right data-sort-value="0.79" | 790 m || 
|-id=593 bgcolor=#E9E9E9
| 373593 ||  || — || February 7, 2002 || Socorro || LINEAR || — || align=right | 2.7 km || 
|-id=594 bgcolor=#E9E9E9
| 373594 ||  || — || February 7, 2002 || Socorro || LINEAR || — || align=right | 1.2 km || 
|-id=595 bgcolor=#E9E9E9
| 373595 ||  || — || February 7, 2002 || Socorro || LINEAR || — || align=right | 2.1 km || 
|-id=596 bgcolor=#E9E9E9
| 373596 ||  || — || February 7, 2002 || Socorro || LINEAR || — || align=right | 1.8 km || 
|-id=597 bgcolor=#E9E9E9
| 373597 ||  || — || February 8, 2002 || Socorro || LINEAR || JUN || align=right | 1.3 km || 
|-id=598 bgcolor=#E9E9E9
| 373598 ||  || — || February 10, 2002 || Socorro || LINEAR || — || align=right | 2.2 km || 
|-id=599 bgcolor=#E9E9E9
| 373599 ||  || — || February 8, 2002 || Socorro || LINEAR || — || align=right | 1.5 km || 
|-id=600 bgcolor=#E9E9E9
| 373600 ||  || — || February 10, 2002 || Socorro || LINEAR || — || align=right | 2.4 km || 
|}

373601–373700 

|-bgcolor=#E9E9E9
| 373601 ||  || — || February 6, 2002 || Palomar || NEAT || — || align=right | 2.3 km || 
|-id=602 bgcolor=#E9E9E9
| 373602 ||  || — || February 11, 2002 || Socorro || LINEAR || — || align=right | 1.8 km || 
|-id=603 bgcolor=#E9E9E9
| 373603 ||  || — || February 11, 2002 || Socorro || LINEAR || — || align=right | 3.7 km || 
|-id=604 bgcolor=#E9E9E9
| 373604 ||  || — || February 11, 2002 || Socorro || LINEAR || — || align=right | 1.6 km || 
|-id=605 bgcolor=#E9E9E9
| 373605 ||  || — || February 3, 2002 || Palomar || NEAT || — || align=right | 1.1 km || 
|-id=606 bgcolor=#E9E9E9
| 373606 ||  || — || February 8, 2002 || Kitt Peak || M. W. Buie || — || align=right | 2.5 km || 
|-id=607 bgcolor=#E9E9E9
| 373607 ||  || — || February 4, 2002 || Anderson Mesa || LONEOS || RAF || align=right | 1.1 km || 
|-id=608 bgcolor=#E9E9E9
| 373608 ||  || — || February 6, 2002 || Palomar || NEAT || — || align=right | 1.5 km || 
|-id=609 bgcolor=#E9E9E9
| 373609 ||  || — || February 7, 2002 || Palomar || NEAT || — || align=right | 2.2 km || 
|-id=610 bgcolor=#E9E9E9
| 373610 ||  || — || February 19, 2002 || Socorro || LINEAR || — || align=right | 3.6 km || 
|-id=611 bgcolor=#E9E9E9
| 373611 ||  || — || March 8, 2002 || Ondřejov || P. Kušnirák, P. Pravec || — || align=right | 2.0 km || 
|-id=612 bgcolor=#fefefe
| 373612 ||  || — || March 11, 2002 || Palomar || NEAT || H || align=right data-sort-value="0.81" | 810 m || 
|-id=613 bgcolor=#E9E9E9
| 373613 ||  || — || March 12, 2002 || Palomar || NEAT || — || align=right | 1.9 km || 
|-id=614 bgcolor=#E9E9E9
| 373614 ||  || — || March 13, 2002 || Socorro || LINEAR || — || align=right | 3.2 km || 
|-id=615 bgcolor=#E9E9E9
| 373615 ||  || — || March 14, 2002 || Socorro || LINEAR || — || align=right | 1.8 km || 
|-id=616 bgcolor=#E9E9E9
| 373616 ||  || — || March 9, 2002 || Anderson Mesa || LONEOS || — || align=right | 1.6 km || 
|-id=617 bgcolor=#E9E9E9
| 373617 ||  || — || March 10, 2002 || Kitt Peak || Spacewatch || MIS || align=right | 2.9 km || 
|-id=618 bgcolor=#FA8072
| 373618 ||  || — || March 17, 2002 || Haleakala || NEAT || Tj (2.93) || align=right | 3.3 km || 
|-id=619 bgcolor=#E9E9E9
| 373619 ||  || — || March 18, 2002 || Desert Eagle || W. K. Y. Yeung || — || align=right | 2.8 km || 
|-id=620 bgcolor=#fefefe
| 373620 ||  || — || March 23, 2002 || Socorro || LINEAR || H || align=right data-sort-value="0.93" | 930 m || 
|-id=621 bgcolor=#E9E9E9
| 373621 ||  || — || April 9, 2002 || Socorro || LINEAR || — || align=right data-sort-value="0.95" | 950 m || 
|-id=622 bgcolor=#d6d6d6
| 373622 ||  || — || April 10, 2002 || Socorro || LINEAR || EUP || align=right | 4.4 km || 
|-id=623 bgcolor=#E9E9E9
| 373623 ||  || — || April 14, 2002 || Anderson Mesa || LONEOS || — || align=right | 3.3 km || 
|-id=624 bgcolor=#fefefe
| 373624 ||  || — || April 8, 2002 || Palomar || NEAT || — || align=right data-sort-value="0.86" | 860 m || 
|-id=625 bgcolor=#fefefe
| 373625 ||  || — || May 2, 2002 || Anderson Mesa || LONEOS || — || align=right data-sort-value="0.77" | 770 m || 
|-id=626 bgcolor=#E9E9E9
| 373626 ||  || — || May 13, 2002 || Palomar || NEAT || — || align=right | 2.4 km || 
|-id=627 bgcolor=#d6d6d6
| 373627 ||  || — || May 9, 2002 || Socorro || LINEAR || — || align=right | 2.1 km || 
|-id=628 bgcolor=#fefefe
| 373628 ||  || — || June 6, 2002 || Socorro || LINEAR || — || align=right | 1.0 km || 
|-id=629 bgcolor=#d6d6d6
| 373629 ||  || — || June 13, 2002 || Kitt Peak || Spacewatch || CHA || align=right | 3.1 km || 
|-id=630 bgcolor=#fefefe
| 373630 ||  || — || July 5, 2002 || Palomar || NEAT || EUT || align=right data-sort-value="0.75" | 750 m || 
|-id=631 bgcolor=#d6d6d6
| 373631 ||  || — || July 10, 2002 || Palomar || NEAT || — || align=right | 3.4 km || 
|-id=632 bgcolor=#fefefe
| 373632 ||  || — || July 14, 2002 || Palomar || NEAT || V || align=right data-sort-value="0.66" | 660 m || 
|-id=633 bgcolor=#d6d6d6
| 373633 ||  || — || July 14, 2002 || Palomar || NEAT || EOS || align=right | 1.9 km || 
|-id=634 bgcolor=#fefefe
| 373634 ||  || — || July 3, 2002 || Palomar || NEAT || — || align=right data-sort-value="0.72" | 720 m || 
|-id=635 bgcolor=#fefefe
| 373635 ||  || — || July 18, 2002 || Socorro || LINEAR || — || align=right data-sort-value="0.59" | 590 m || 
|-id=636 bgcolor=#fefefe
| 373636 ||  || — || July 23, 2002 || Palomar || M. Meyer || ERI || align=right | 1.2 km || 
|-id=637 bgcolor=#fefefe
| 373637 ||  || — || July 29, 2002 || Palomar || NEAT || FLO || align=right data-sort-value="0.71" | 710 m || 
|-id=638 bgcolor=#d6d6d6
| 373638 ||  || — || July 29, 2002 || Palomar || NEAT || — || align=right | 2.7 km || 
|-id=639 bgcolor=#d6d6d6
| 373639 ||  || — || August 5, 2002 || Palomar || NEAT || TIR || align=right | 2.6 km || 
|-id=640 bgcolor=#d6d6d6
| 373640 ||  || — || August 2, 2002 || Campo Imperatore || CINEOS || — || align=right | 2.6 km || 
|-id=641 bgcolor=#d6d6d6
| 373641 ||  || — || August 5, 2002 || Palomar || NEAT || — || align=right | 4.1 km || 
|-id=642 bgcolor=#fefefe
| 373642 ||  || — || August 6, 2002 || Palomar || NEAT || critical || align=right data-sort-value="0.68" | 680 m || 
|-id=643 bgcolor=#fefefe
| 373643 ||  || — || August 2, 2002 || Campo Imperatore || CINEOS || — || align=right data-sort-value="0.74" | 740 m || 
|-id=644 bgcolor=#fefefe
| 373644 ||  || — || August 11, 2002 || Palomar || NEAT || MAS || align=right data-sort-value="0.71" | 710 m || 
|-id=645 bgcolor=#d6d6d6
| 373645 ||  || — || August 11, 2002 || Palomar || NEAT || — || align=right | 3.2 km || 
|-id=646 bgcolor=#d6d6d6
| 373646 ||  || — || August 12, 2002 || Socorro || LINEAR || — || align=right | 3.7 km || 
|-id=647 bgcolor=#fefefe
| 373647 ||  || — || August 9, 2002 || Cerro Tololo || M. W. Buie || MAS || align=right data-sort-value="0.57" | 570 m || 
|-id=648 bgcolor=#E9E9E9
| 373648 ||  || — || August 8, 2002 || Palomar || A. Lowe || — || align=right | 3.5 km || 
|-id=649 bgcolor=#d6d6d6
| 373649 ||  || — || August 8, 2002 || Palomar || NEAT || — || align=right | 3.1 km || 
|-id=650 bgcolor=#d6d6d6
| 373650 ||  || — || August 8, 2002 || Palomar || NEAT || — || align=right | 3.0 km || 
|-id=651 bgcolor=#fefefe
| 373651 ||  || — || August 15, 2002 || Palomar || NEAT || V || align=right data-sort-value="0.60" | 600 m || 
|-id=652 bgcolor=#fefefe
| 373652 ||  || — || August 7, 2002 || Palomar || NEAT || NYS || align=right data-sort-value="0.56" | 560 m || 
|-id=653 bgcolor=#d6d6d6
| 373653 ||  || — || August 17, 2002 || Socorro || LINEAR || EUP || align=right | 4.5 km || 
|-id=654 bgcolor=#d6d6d6
| 373654 ||  || — || August 26, 2002 || Palomar || NEAT || — || align=right | 2.6 km || 
|-id=655 bgcolor=#fefefe
| 373655 ||  || — || August 28, 2002 || Palomar || NEAT || — || align=right data-sort-value="0.70" | 700 m || 
|-id=656 bgcolor=#d6d6d6
| 373656 ||  || — || August 29, 2002 || Palomar || S. F. Hönig || — || align=right | 2.4 km || 
|-id=657 bgcolor=#fefefe
| 373657 ||  || — || August 28, 2002 || Palomar || NEAT || H || align=right data-sort-value="0.48" | 480 m || 
|-id=658 bgcolor=#fefefe
| 373658 ||  || — || August 18, 2002 || Palomar || NEAT || NYS || align=right data-sort-value="0.54" | 540 m || 
|-id=659 bgcolor=#fefefe
| 373659 ||  || — || August 17, 2002 || Palomar || NEAT || NYS || align=right data-sort-value="0.57" | 570 m || 
|-id=660 bgcolor=#d6d6d6
| 373660 ||  || — || August 27, 2002 || Palomar || NEAT || — || align=right | 2.6 km || 
|-id=661 bgcolor=#d6d6d6
| 373661 ||  || — || August 19, 2002 || Palomar || NEAT || TIR || align=right | 2.9 km || 
|-id=662 bgcolor=#d6d6d6
| 373662 ||  || — || August 18, 2002 || Palomar || NEAT || — || align=right | 2.9 km || 
|-id=663 bgcolor=#d6d6d6
| 373663 ||  || — || August 17, 2002 || Palomar || NEAT || — || align=right | 2.9 km || 
|-id=664 bgcolor=#d6d6d6
| 373664 ||  || — || August 16, 2002 || Palomar || NEAT || EOS || align=right | 2.0 km || 
|-id=665 bgcolor=#d6d6d6
| 373665 ||  || — || August 19, 2002 || Palomar || NEAT || — || align=right | 2.5 km || 
|-id=666 bgcolor=#d6d6d6
| 373666 ||  || — || August 16, 2002 || Palomar || NEAT || — || align=right | 2.2 km || 
|-id=667 bgcolor=#d6d6d6
| 373667 ||  || — || August 27, 2002 || Palomar || NEAT || — || align=right | 2.1 km || 
|-id=668 bgcolor=#fefefe
| 373668 ||  || — || August 27, 2002 || Palomar || NEAT || MAS || align=right data-sort-value="0.59" | 590 m || 
|-id=669 bgcolor=#d6d6d6
| 373669 ||  || — || August 29, 2002 || Palomar || NEAT || — || align=right | 2.8 km || 
|-id=670 bgcolor=#d6d6d6
| 373670 ||  || — || August 19, 2002 || Palomar || NEAT || EOS || align=right | 2.0 km || 
|-id=671 bgcolor=#d6d6d6
| 373671 ||  || — || August 30, 2002 || Palomar || NEAT || — || align=right | 2.2 km || 
|-id=672 bgcolor=#d6d6d6
| 373672 ||  || — || August 19, 2002 || Palomar || NEAT || EOS || align=right | 2.3 km || 
|-id=673 bgcolor=#d6d6d6
| 373673 ||  || — || August 28, 2002 || Palomar || NEAT || — || align=right | 3.0 km || 
|-id=674 bgcolor=#d6d6d6
| 373674 ||  || — || August 18, 2002 || Palomar || NEAT || — || align=right | 2.6 km || 
|-id=675 bgcolor=#d6d6d6
| 373675 ||  || — || August 18, 2002 || Palomar || NEAT || — || align=right | 3.9 km || 
|-id=676 bgcolor=#d6d6d6
| 373676 ||  || — || August 16, 2002 || Palomar || NEAT || — || align=right | 2.8 km || 
|-id=677 bgcolor=#fefefe
| 373677 ||  || — || August 29, 2002 || Palomar || NEAT || — || align=right data-sort-value="0.80" | 800 m || 
|-id=678 bgcolor=#fefefe
| 373678 ||  || — || August 29, 2002 || Palomar || NEAT || — || align=right data-sort-value="0.87" | 870 m || 
|-id=679 bgcolor=#d6d6d6
| 373679 ||  || — || August 30, 2002 || Palomar || NEAT || — || align=right | 3.1 km || 
|-id=680 bgcolor=#d6d6d6
| 373680 ||  || — || October 10, 1997 || Kitt Peak || Spacewatch || — || align=right | 2.2 km || 
|-id=681 bgcolor=#d6d6d6
| 373681 ||  || — || September 3, 2002 || Palomar || NEAT || — || align=right | 3.5 km || 
|-id=682 bgcolor=#d6d6d6
| 373682 ||  || — || September 3, 2002 || Palomar || NEAT || — || align=right | 2.9 km || 
|-id=683 bgcolor=#d6d6d6
| 373683 ||  || — || September 4, 2002 || Palomar || NEAT || — || align=right | 3.5 km || 
|-id=684 bgcolor=#d6d6d6
| 373684 ||  || — || September 4, 2002 || Anderson Mesa || LONEOS || — || align=right | 4.9 km || 
|-id=685 bgcolor=#fefefe
| 373685 ||  || — || September 4, 2002 || Anderson Mesa || LONEOS || — || align=right | 1.2 km || 
|-id=686 bgcolor=#d6d6d6
| 373686 ||  || — || September 4, 2002 || Anderson Mesa || LONEOS || — || align=right | 4.1 km || 
|-id=687 bgcolor=#fefefe
| 373687 ||  || — || September 5, 2002 || Socorro || LINEAR || NYS || align=right data-sort-value="0.69" | 690 m || 
|-id=688 bgcolor=#d6d6d6
| 373688 ||  || — || September 4, 2002 || Anderson Mesa || LONEOS || — || align=right | 3.6 km || 
|-id=689 bgcolor=#fefefe
| 373689 ||  || — || September 5, 2002 || Socorro || LINEAR || NYS || align=right data-sort-value="0.92" | 920 m || 
|-id=690 bgcolor=#d6d6d6
| 373690 ||  || — || September 5, 2002 || Socorro || LINEAR || — || align=right | 4.0 km || 
|-id=691 bgcolor=#d6d6d6
| 373691 ||  || — || September 5, 2002 || Socorro || LINEAR || — || align=right | 3.2 km || 
|-id=692 bgcolor=#fefefe
| 373692 ||  || — || September 5, 2002 || Socorro || LINEAR || NYS || align=right data-sort-value="0.69" | 690 m || 
|-id=693 bgcolor=#d6d6d6
| 373693 ||  || — || September 5, 2002 || Socorro || LINEAR || — || align=right | 5.5 km || 
|-id=694 bgcolor=#fefefe
| 373694 ||  || — || September 6, 2002 || Socorro || LINEAR || — || align=right data-sort-value="0.81" | 810 m || 
|-id=695 bgcolor=#fefefe
| 373695 ||  || — || September 8, 2002 || Ondřejov || P. Pravec, P. Kušnirák || ERI || align=right | 1.9 km || 
|-id=696 bgcolor=#fefefe
| 373696 ||  || — || September 10, 2002 || Palomar || NEAT || — || align=right | 1.1 km || 
|-id=697 bgcolor=#d6d6d6
| 373697 ||  || — || September 11, 2002 || Palomar || NEAT || HYG || align=right | 2.7 km || 
|-id=698 bgcolor=#d6d6d6
| 373698 ||  || — || September 12, 2002 || Palomar || NEAT || — || align=right | 2.9 km || 
|-id=699 bgcolor=#fefefe
| 373699 ||  || — || September 11, 2002 || Palomar || NEAT || NYS || align=right data-sort-value="0.63" | 630 m || 
|-id=700 bgcolor=#fefefe
| 373700 ||  || — || September 13, 2002 || Socorro || LINEAR || NYS || align=right data-sort-value="0.79" | 790 m || 
|}

373701–373800 

|-bgcolor=#d6d6d6
| 373701 ||  || — || September 13, 2002 || Palomar || NEAT || — || align=right | 3.9 km || 
|-id=702 bgcolor=#fefefe
| 373702 ||  || — || September 13, 2002 || Palomar || NEAT || MAS || align=right data-sort-value="0.67" | 670 m || 
|-id=703 bgcolor=#d6d6d6
| 373703 ||  || — || September 14, 2002 || Palomar || NEAT || — || align=right | 2.8 km || 
|-id=704 bgcolor=#d6d6d6
| 373704 ||  || — || September 15, 2002 || Palomar || R. Matson || — || align=right | 2.8 km || 
|-id=705 bgcolor=#d6d6d6
| 373705 ||  || — || September 15, 2002 || Palomar || R. Matson || — || align=right | 3.8 km || 
|-id=706 bgcolor=#d6d6d6
| 373706 ||  || — || September 14, 2002 || Palomar || R. Matson || — || align=right | 2.5 km || 
|-id=707 bgcolor=#fefefe
| 373707 ||  || — || September 15, 2002 || Palomar || NEAT || — || align=right data-sort-value="0.73" | 730 m || 
|-id=708 bgcolor=#d6d6d6
| 373708 ||  || — || September 14, 2002 || Palomar || NEAT || — || align=right | 2.5 km || 
|-id=709 bgcolor=#fefefe
| 373709 ||  || — || September 14, 2002 || Palomar || NEAT || — || align=right data-sort-value="0.62" | 620 m || 
|-id=710 bgcolor=#d6d6d6
| 373710 ||  || — || September 4, 2002 || Palomar || NEAT || — || align=right | 2.6 km || 
|-id=711 bgcolor=#d6d6d6
| 373711 ||  || — || September 14, 2002 || Palomar || NEAT || — || align=right | 3.1 km || 
|-id=712 bgcolor=#d6d6d6
| 373712 ||  || — || September 15, 2002 || Palomar || NEAT || ANF || align=right | 1.8 km || 
|-id=713 bgcolor=#d6d6d6
| 373713 ||  || — || September 12, 2002 || Palomar || NEAT || — || align=right | 2.7 km || 
|-id=714 bgcolor=#fefefe
| 373714 ||  || — || September 10, 2002 || Palomar || NEAT || — || align=right data-sort-value="0.79" | 790 m || 
|-id=715 bgcolor=#d6d6d6
| 373715 ||  || — || September 14, 2002 || Palomar || NEAT || EOS || align=right | 4.4 km || 
|-id=716 bgcolor=#d6d6d6
| 373716 ||  || — || September 4, 2002 || Palomar || NEAT || EOS || align=right | 1.9 km || 
|-id=717 bgcolor=#d6d6d6
| 373717 ||  || — || September 14, 2002 || Palomar || NEAT || EOS || align=right | 2.0 km || 
|-id=718 bgcolor=#d6d6d6
| 373718 ||  || — || September 14, 2002 || Palomar || NEAT || 637 || align=right | 2.6 km || 
|-id=719 bgcolor=#d6d6d6
| 373719 ||  || — || September 4, 2002 || Palomar || NEAT || — || align=right | 2.8 km || 
|-id=720 bgcolor=#d6d6d6
| 373720 ||  || — || September 1, 2002 || Haleakala || NEAT || — || align=right | 3.0 km || 
|-id=721 bgcolor=#fefefe
| 373721 ||  || — || September 14, 2002 || Palomar || NEAT || NYS || align=right data-sort-value="0.70" | 700 m || 
|-id=722 bgcolor=#d6d6d6
| 373722 ||  || — || September 27, 2002 || Palomar || NEAT || — || align=right | 2.6 km || 
|-id=723 bgcolor=#d6d6d6
| 373723 ||  || — || September 27, 2002 || Palomar || NEAT || — || align=right | 3.5 km || 
|-id=724 bgcolor=#fefefe
| 373724 ||  || — || September 27, 2002 || Palomar || NEAT || NYS || align=right | 1.0 km || 
|-id=725 bgcolor=#d6d6d6
| 373725 ||  || — || September 26, 2002 || Haleakala || NEAT || — || align=right | 4.3 km || 
|-id=726 bgcolor=#fefefe
| 373726 ||  || — || September 28, 2002 || Palomar || NEAT || — || align=right data-sort-value="0.91" | 910 m || 
|-id=727 bgcolor=#fefefe
| 373727 ||  || — || September 28, 2002 || Haleakala || NEAT || NYS || align=right data-sort-value="0.70" | 700 m || 
|-id=728 bgcolor=#fefefe
| 373728 ||  || — || September 28, 2002 || Haleakala || NEAT || NYS || align=right data-sort-value="0.78" | 780 m || 
|-id=729 bgcolor=#fefefe
| 373729 ||  || — || September 30, 2002 || Socorro || LINEAR || — || align=right data-sort-value="0.86" | 860 m || 
|-id=730 bgcolor=#fefefe
| 373730 ||  || — || September 16, 2002 || Palomar || NEAT || FLO || align=right data-sort-value="0.70" | 700 m || 
|-id=731 bgcolor=#fefefe
| 373731 ||  || — || September 26, 2002 || Palomar || NEAT || — || align=right data-sort-value="0.76" | 760 m || 
|-id=732 bgcolor=#d6d6d6
| 373732 ||  || — || October 1, 2002 || Anderson Mesa || LONEOS || EUP || align=right | 3.5 km || 
|-id=733 bgcolor=#fefefe
| 373733 ||  || — || September 5, 2002 || Xinglong || SCAP || NYS || align=right data-sort-value="0.77" | 770 m || 
|-id=734 bgcolor=#d6d6d6
| 373734 ||  || — || October 2, 2002 || Socorro || LINEAR || — || align=right | 4.2 km || 
|-id=735 bgcolor=#fefefe
| 373735 ||  || — || October 2, 2002 || Socorro || LINEAR || NYS || align=right data-sort-value="0.65" | 650 m || 
|-id=736 bgcolor=#fefefe
| 373736 ||  || — || October 2, 2002 || Socorro || LINEAR || NYS || align=right data-sort-value="0.90" | 900 m || 
|-id=737 bgcolor=#fefefe
| 373737 ||  || — || October 2, 2002 || Socorro || LINEAR || NYS || align=right data-sort-value="0.74" | 740 m || 
|-id=738 bgcolor=#d6d6d6
| 373738 ||  || — || October 2, 2002 || Socorro || LINEAR || — || align=right | 4.4 km || 
|-id=739 bgcolor=#fefefe
| 373739 ||  || — || September 8, 2002 || Campo Imperatore || CINEOS || — || align=right | 1.2 km || 
|-id=740 bgcolor=#fefefe
| 373740 ||  || — || October 3, 2002 || Socorro || LINEAR || NYS || align=right data-sort-value="0.77" | 770 m || 
|-id=741 bgcolor=#d6d6d6
| 373741 ||  || — || October 4, 2002 || Palomar || NEAT || — || align=right | 4.0 km || 
|-id=742 bgcolor=#d6d6d6
| 373742 ||  || — || October 3, 2002 || Palomar || NEAT || EUP || align=right | 6.8 km || 
|-id=743 bgcolor=#d6d6d6
| 373743 ||  || — || October 3, 2002 || Palomar || NEAT || — || align=right | 3.4 km || 
|-id=744 bgcolor=#d6d6d6
| 373744 ||  || — || October 1, 2002 || Anderson Mesa || LONEOS || — || align=right | 3.8 km || 
|-id=745 bgcolor=#d6d6d6
| 373745 ||  || — || October 2, 2002 || Haleakala || NEAT || HYG || align=right | 3.9 km || 
|-id=746 bgcolor=#d6d6d6
| 373746 ||  || — || October 2, 2002 || Campo Imperatore || CINEOS || — || align=right | 3.6 km || 
|-id=747 bgcolor=#d6d6d6
| 373747 ||  || — || October 3, 2002 || Socorro || LINEAR || THM || align=right | 2.8 km || 
|-id=748 bgcolor=#fefefe
| 373748 ||  || — || October 4, 2002 || Socorro || LINEAR || FLO || align=right data-sort-value="0.68" | 680 m || 
|-id=749 bgcolor=#fefefe
| 373749 ||  || — || October 4, 2002 || Anderson Mesa || LONEOS || — || align=right data-sort-value="0.94" | 940 m || 
|-id=750 bgcolor=#fefefe
| 373750 ||  || — || October 4, 2002 || Socorro || LINEAR || — || align=right data-sort-value="0.95" | 950 m || 
|-id=751 bgcolor=#d6d6d6
| 373751 ||  || — || October 4, 2002 || Socorro || LINEAR || — || align=right | 3.4 km || 
|-id=752 bgcolor=#fefefe
| 373752 ||  || — || October 2, 2002 || Socorro || LINEAR || NYS || align=right data-sort-value="0.74" | 740 m || 
|-id=753 bgcolor=#fefefe
| 373753 ||  || — || October 5, 2002 || Socorro || LINEAR || — || align=right data-sort-value="0.89" | 890 m || 
|-id=754 bgcolor=#d6d6d6
| 373754 ||  || — || October 5, 2002 || Palomar || NEAT || TIR || align=right | 4.0 km || 
|-id=755 bgcolor=#fefefe
| 373755 ||  || — || October 3, 2002 || Palomar || NEAT || — || align=right | 1.0 km || 
|-id=756 bgcolor=#d6d6d6
| 373756 ||  || — || October 3, 2002 || Palomar || NEAT || — || align=right | 3.6 km || 
|-id=757 bgcolor=#d6d6d6
| 373757 ||  || — || October 3, 2002 || Palomar || NEAT || — || align=right | 5.5 km || 
|-id=758 bgcolor=#fefefe
| 373758 ||  || — || October 4, 2002 || Socorro || LINEAR || — || align=right data-sort-value="0.82" | 820 m || 
|-id=759 bgcolor=#fefefe
| 373759 ||  || — || October 4, 2002 || Socorro || LINEAR || — || align=right | 1.1 km || 
|-id=760 bgcolor=#d6d6d6
| 373760 ||  || — || October 4, 2002 || Socorro || LINEAR || — || align=right | 4.5 km || 
|-id=761 bgcolor=#d6d6d6
| 373761 ||  || — || October 4, 2002 || Socorro || LINEAR || — || align=right | 4.2 km || 
|-id=762 bgcolor=#d6d6d6
| 373762 ||  || — || October 7, 2002 || Socorro || LINEAR || — || align=right | 4.7 km || 
|-id=763 bgcolor=#d6d6d6
| 373763 ||  || — || October 6, 2002 || Socorro || LINEAR || — || align=right | 4.1 km || 
|-id=764 bgcolor=#d6d6d6
| 373764 ||  || — || October 8, 2002 || Anderson Mesa || LONEOS || — || align=right | 3.7 km || 
|-id=765 bgcolor=#fefefe
| 373765 ||  || — || October 9, 2002 || Socorro || LINEAR || MAS || align=right data-sort-value="0.73" | 730 m || 
|-id=766 bgcolor=#d6d6d6
| 373766 ||  || — || October 9, 2002 || Kitt Peak || Spacewatch || — || align=right | 4.7 km || 
|-id=767 bgcolor=#d6d6d6
| 373767 ||  || — || October 9, 2002 || Socorro || LINEAR || ALA || align=right | 3.1 km || 
|-id=768 bgcolor=#d6d6d6
| 373768 ||  || — || October 9, 2002 || Palomar || NEAT || Tj (2.99) || align=right | 3.7 km || 
|-id=769 bgcolor=#fefefe
| 373769 ||  || — || October 4, 2002 || Socorro || LINEAR || — || align=right data-sort-value="0.96" | 960 m || 
|-id=770 bgcolor=#fefefe
| 373770 ||  || — || October 4, 2002 || Socorro || LINEAR || ERI || align=right | 1.6 km || 
|-id=771 bgcolor=#d6d6d6
| 373771 ||  || — || October 10, 2002 || Socorro || LINEAR || — || align=right | 4.5 km || 
|-id=772 bgcolor=#fefefe
| 373772 ||  || — || October 10, 2002 || Socorro || LINEAR || — || align=right | 1.1 km || 
|-id=773 bgcolor=#fefefe
| 373773 ||  || — || October 4, 2002 || Apache Point || SDSS || NYS || align=right data-sort-value="0.51" | 510 m || 
|-id=774 bgcolor=#d6d6d6
| 373774 ||  || — || October 4, 2002 || Apache Point || SDSS || URS || align=right | 3.9 km || 
|-id=775 bgcolor=#fefefe
| 373775 ||  || — || October 4, 2002 || Apache Point || SDSS || — || align=right data-sort-value="0.83" | 830 m || 
|-id=776 bgcolor=#d6d6d6
| 373776 ||  || — || October 5, 2002 || Apache Point || SDSS || — || align=right | 3.8 km || 
|-id=777 bgcolor=#d6d6d6
| 373777 ||  || — || October 5, 2002 || Apache Point || SDSS || THM || align=right | 2.2 km || 
|-id=778 bgcolor=#fefefe
| 373778 ||  || — || October 5, 2002 || Apache Point || SDSS || MAS || align=right data-sort-value="0.70" | 700 m || 
|-id=779 bgcolor=#d6d6d6
| 373779 ||  || — || October 5, 2002 || Apache Point || SDSS || — || align=right | 3.6 km || 
|-id=780 bgcolor=#d6d6d6
| 373780 ||  || — || October 5, 2002 || Apache Point || SDSS || HYG || align=right | 2.7 km || 
|-id=781 bgcolor=#d6d6d6
| 373781 ||  || — || October 5, 2002 || Apache Point || SDSS || — || align=right | 4.3 km || 
|-id=782 bgcolor=#d6d6d6
| 373782 ||  || — || October 5, 2002 || Apache Point || SDSS || — || align=right | 3.8 km || 
|-id=783 bgcolor=#d6d6d6
| 373783 ||  || — || October 10, 2002 || Apache Point || SDSS || EOS || align=right | 2.6 km || 
|-id=784 bgcolor=#fefefe
| 373784 ||  || — || October 10, 2002 || Apache Point || SDSS || V || align=right data-sort-value="0.56" | 560 m || 
|-id=785 bgcolor=#fefefe
| 373785 ||  || — || October 10, 2002 || Apache Point || SDSS || NYS || align=right data-sort-value="0.49" | 490 m || 
|-id=786 bgcolor=#d6d6d6
| 373786 ||  || — || October 29, 2002 || Socorro || LINEAR || — || align=right | 4.7 km || 
|-id=787 bgcolor=#d6d6d6
| 373787 ||  || — || October 28, 2002 || Palomar || NEAT || — || align=right | 4.1 km || 
|-id=788 bgcolor=#d6d6d6
| 373788 ||  || — || October 28, 2002 || Haleakala || NEAT || — || align=right | 5.1 km || 
|-id=789 bgcolor=#fefefe
| 373789 ||  || — || October 30, 2002 || Kvistaberg || UDAS || ERI || align=right | 1.6 km || 
|-id=790 bgcolor=#fefefe
| 373790 ||  || — || October 31, 2002 || Palomar || NEAT || NYS || align=right data-sort-value="0.86" | 860 m || 
|-id=791 bgcolor=#d6d6d6
| 373791 ||  || — || October 30, 2002 || Apache Point || SDSS || EOS || align=right | 2.3 km || 
|-id=792 bgcolor=#d6d6d6
| 373792 ||  || — || October 30, 2002 || Apache Point || SDSS || — || align=right | 2.3 km || 
|-id=793 bgcolor=#d6d6d6
| 373793 ||  || — || October 18, 2002 || Palomar || NEAT || EOS || align=right | 2.7 km || 
|-id=794 bgcolor=#d6d6d6
| 373794 ||  || — || October 16, 2002 || Palomar || NEAT || — || align=right | 3.6 km || 
|-id=795 bgcolor=#d6d6d6
| 373795 ||  || — || October 31, 2002 || Palomar || NEAT || — || align=right | 3.9 km || 
|-id=796 bgcolor=#d6d6d6
| 373796 ||  || — || October 31, 2002 || Palomar || NEAT || THM || align=right | 2.4 km || 
|-id=797 bgcolor=#d6d6d6
| 373797 ||  || — || November 1, 2002 || Palomar || NEAT || TIR || align=right | 3.9 km || 
|-id=798 bgcolor=#fefefe
| 373798 ||  || — || November 5, 2002 || Socorro || LINEAR || — || align=right | 1.1 km || 
|-id=799 bgcolor=#fefefe
| 373799 ||  || — || November 5, 2002 || Socorro || LINEAR || — || align=right | 1.1 km || 
|-id=800 bgcolor=#fefefe
| 373800 ||  || — || November 5, 2002 || Socorro || LINEAR || NYS || align=right data-sort-value="0.88" | 880 m || 
|}

373801–373900 

|-bgcolor=#fefefe
| 373801 ||  || — || November 5, 2002 || Kitt Peak || Spacewatch || MAS || align=right data-sort-value="0.89" | 890 m || 
|-id=802 bgcolor=#d6d6d6
| 373802 ||  || — || November 5, 2002 || Palomar || NEAT || EOS || align=right | 2.9 km || 
|-id=803 bgcolor=#d6d6d6
| 373803 ||  || — || November 5, 2002 || Fountain Hills || Fountain Hills Obs. || — || align=right | 5.9 km || 
|-id=804 bgcolor=#d6d6d6
| 373804 ||  || — || November 6, 2002 || Kitt Peak || Spacewatch || HYG || align=right | 3.2 km || 
|-id=805 bgcolor=#d6d6d6
| 373805 ||  || — || November 7, 2002 || Socorro || LINEAR || THM || align=right | 3.3 km || 
|-id=806 bgcolor=#d6d6d6
| 373806 ||  || — || November 11, 2002 || Socorro || LINEAR || — || align=right | 3.9 km || 
|-id=807 bgcolor=#d6d6d6
| 373807 ||  || — || November 5, 2002 || Socorro || LINEAR || — || align=right | 4.2 km || 
|-id=808 bgcolor=#d6d6d6
| 373808 ||  || — || November 11, 2002 || Anderson Mesa || LONEOS || LIX || align=right | 3.8 km || 
|-id=809 bgcolor=#d6d6d6
| 373809 ||  || — || November 11, 2002 || Anderson Mesa || LONEOS || TIR || align=right | 3.2 km || 
|-id=810 bgcolor=#d6d6d6
| 373810 ||  || — || November 14, 2002 || Nogales || Tenagra II Obs. || — || align=right | 3.1 km || 
|-id=811 bgcolor=#d6d6d6
| 373811 ||  || — || November 9, 2002 || Kitt Peak || M. W. Buie || — || align=right | 2.6 km || 
|-id=812 bgcolor=#d6d6d6
| 373812 ||  || — || November 6, 2002 || Socorro || LINEAR || THM || align=right | 2.7 km || 
|-id=813 bgcolor=#C2FFFF
| 373813 ||  || — || November 5, 2002 || Palomar || NEAT || L5 || align=right | 13 km || 
|-id=814 bgcolor=#d6d6d6
| 373814 ||  || — || November 15, 2002 || Palomar || NEAT || URS || align=right | 3.6 km || 
|-id=815 bgcolor=#d6d6d6
| 373815 ||  || — || November 5, 2002 || Palomar || NEAT || — || align=right | 2.9 km || 
|-id=816 bgcolor=#fefefe
| 373816 ||  || — || November 23, 2002 || Palomar || NEAT || — || align=right | 1.1 km || 
|-id=817 bgcolor=#d6d6d6
| 373817 ||  || — || November 16, 2002 || Palomar || NEAT || THM || align=right | 2.4 km || 
|-id=818 bgcolor=#d6d6d6
| 373818 ||  || — || November 22, 2002 || Palomar || NEAT || — || align=right | 3.2 km || 
|-id=819 bgcolor=#d6d6d6
| 373819 ||  || — || November 23, 2002 || Palomar || NEAT || — || align=right | 3.5 km || 
|-id=820 bgcolor=#C2FFFF
| 373820 ||  || — || November 22, 2002 || Palomar || NEAT || L5 || align=right | 11 km || 
|-id=821 bgcolor=#fefefe
| 373821 ||  || — || December 2, 2002 || Socorro || LINEAR || MAS || align=right data-sort-value="0.87" | 870 m || 
|-id=822 bgcolor=#fefefe
| 373822 ||  || — || December 2, 2002 || Socorro || LINEAR || MAS || align=right data-sort-value="0.86" | 860 m || 
|-id=823 bgcolor=#fefefe
| 373823 ||  || — || December 2, 2002 || Haleakala || NEAT || MAS || align=right data-sort-value="0.93" | 930 m || 
|-id=824 bgcolor=#fefefe
| 373824 ||  || — || December 3, 2002 || Palomar || NEAT || — || align=right | 1.2 km || 
|-id=825 bgcolor=#FA8072
| 373825 ||  || — || December 3, 2002 || Palomar || NEAT || — || align=right data-sort-value="0.87" | 870 m || 
|-id=826 bgcolor=#d6d6d6
| 373826 ||  || — || December 3, 2002 || Palomar || NEAT || — || align=right | 3.8 km || 
|-id=827 bgcolor=#d6d6d6
| 373827 ||  || — || December 2, 2002 || Socorro || LINEAR || HYG || align=right | 3.5 km || 
|-id=828 bgcolor=#fefefe
| 373828 ||  || — || December 9, 2002 || Kitt Peak || Spacewatch || — || align=right data-sort-value="0.92" | 920 m || 
|-id=829 bgcolor=#fefefe
| 373829 ||  || — || December 10, 2002 || Socorro || LINEAR || NYS || align=right data-sort-value="0.72" | 720 m || 
|-id=830 bgcolor=#fefefe
| 373830 ||  || — || December 11, 2002 || Socorro || LINEAR || PHO || align=right | 1.8 km || 
|-id=831 bgcolor=#fefefe
| 373831 ||  || — || December 11, 2002 || Socorro || LINEAR || — || align=right | 1.1 km || 
|-id=832 bgcolor=#d6d6d6
| 373832 ||  || — || December 12, 2002 || Palomar || NEAT || — || align=right | 4.4 km || 
|-id=833 bgcolor=#d6d6d6
| 373833 ||  || — || December 5, 2002 || Socorro || LINEAR || HYG || align=right | 3.2 km || 
|-id=834 bgcolor=#FA8072
| 373834 ||  || — || December 6, 2002 || Socorro || LINEAR || — || align=right data-sort-value="0.73" | 730 m || 
|-id=835 bgcolor=#d6d6d6
| 373835 ||  || — || December 31, 2002 || Anderson Mesa || LONEOS || — || align=right | 4.6 km || 
|-id=836 bgcolor=#fefefe
| 373836 ||  || — || December 31, 2002 || Socorro || LINEAR || — || align=right | 2.6 km || 
|-id=837 bgcolor=#fefefe
| 373837 ||  || — || January 7, 2003 || Socorro || LINEAR || — || align=right | 1.1 km || 
|-id=838 bgcolor=#E9E9E9
| 373838 ||  || — || January 27, 2003 || Socorro || LINEAR || — || align=right | 1.4 km || 
|-id=839 bgcolor=#fefefe
| 373839 ||  || — || January 29, 2003 || Palomar || NEAT || NYS || align=right data-sort-value="0.69" | 690 m || 
|-id=840 bgcolor=#E9E9E9
| 373840 ||  || — || March 6, 2003 || Anderson Mesa || LONEOS || — || align=right | 1.7 km || 
|-id=841 bgcolor=#E9E9E9
| 373841 ||  || — || March 10, 2003 || Kitt Peak || Spacewatch || MAR || align=right | 1.2 km || 
|-id=842 bgcolor=#E9E9E9
| 373842 || 2003 FT || — || March 21, 2003 || Majorca || OAM Obs. || — || align=right | 2.0 km || 
|-id=843 bgcolor=#E9E9E9
| 373843 ||  || — || March 26, 2003 || Palomar || NEAT || — || align=right | 2.0 km || 
|-id=844 bgcolor=#E9E9E9
| 373844 ||  || — || March 27, 2003 || Kitt Peak || Spacewatch || — || align=right | 2.3 km || 
|-id=845 bgcolor=#E9E9E9
| 373845 ||  || — || March 27, 2003 || Palomar || NEAT || ADE || align=right | 2.6 km || 
|-id=846 bgcolor=#E9E9E9
| 373846 ||  || — || April 1, 2003 || Socorro || LINEAR || MAR || align=right | 1.5 km || 
|-id=847 bgcolor=#E9E9E9
| 373847 ||  || — || February 27, 2003 || Campo Imperatore || CINEOS || — || align=right | 2.0 km || 
|-id=848 bgcolor=#E9E9E9
| 373848 ||  || — || March 26, 2003 || Anderson Mesa || LONEOS || — || align=right | 2.1 km || 
|-id=849 bgcolor=#E9E9E9
| 373849 ||  || — || April 9, 2003 || Kitt Peak || Spacewatch || — || align=right | 1.3 km || 
|-id=850 bgcolor=#E9E9E9
| 373850 ||  || — || April 29, 2003 || Socorro || LINEAR || — || align=right | 1.5 km || 
|-id=851 bgcolor=#E9E9E9
| 373851 ||  || — || April 11, 2003 || Kitt Peak || Spacewatch || — || align=right | 3.5 km || 
|-id=852 bgcolor=#E9E9E9
| 373852 ||  || — || May 1, 2003 || Socorro || LINEAR || EUN || align=right | 1.6 km || 
|-id=853 bgcolor=#fefefe
| 373853 ||  || — || July 22, 2003 || Campo Imperatore || CINEOS || — || align=right data-sort-value="0.69" | 690 m || 
|-id=854 bgcolor=#d6d6d6
| 373854 ||  || — || July 28, 2003 || Palomar || NEAT || — || align=right | 2.8 km || 
|-id=855 bgcolor=#fefefe
| 373855 ||  || — || August 20, 2003 || Campo Imperatore || CINEOS || — || align=right data-sort-value="0.83" | 830 m || 
|-id=856 bgcolor=#FA8072
| 373856 ||  || — || August 23, 2003 || Socorro || LINEAR || H || align=right data-sort-value="0.67" | 670 m || 
|-id=857 bgcolor=#fefefe
| 373857 ||  || — || August 22, 2003 || Socorro || LINEAR || — || align=right data-sort-value="0.77" | 770 m || 
|-id=858 bgcolor=#fefefe
| 373858 ||  || — || August 22, 2003 || Palomar || NEAT || — || align=right data-sort-value="0.81" | 810 m || 
|-id=859 bgcolor=#d6d6d6
| 373859 ||  || — || August 4, 2003 || Kitt Peak || Spacewatch || KOR || align=right | 1.3 km || 
|-id=860 bgcolor=#fefefe
| 373860 ||  || — || August 29, 2003 || Haleakala || NEAT || FLO || align=right data-sort-value="0.82" | 820 m || 
|-id=861 bgcolor=#d6d6d6
| 373861 ||  || — || September 1, 2003 || Socorro || LINEAR || BRA || align=right | 1.9 km || 
|-id=862 bgcolor=#E9E9E9
| 373862 ||  || — || September 2, 2003 || Socorro || LINEAR || — || align=right | 4.2 km || 
|-id=863 bgcolor=#d6d6d6
| 373863 ||  || — || September 16, 2003 || Kitt Peak || Spacewatch || K-2 || align=right | 1.3 km || 
|-id=864 bgcolor=#d6d6d6
| 373864 ||  || — || September 16, 2003 || Kitt Peak || Spacewatch || — || align=right | 2.5 km || 
|-id=865 bgcolor=#d6d6d6
| 373865 ||  || — || September 17, 2003 || Kitt Peak || Spacewatch || — || align=right | 3.3 km || 
|-id=866 bgcolor=#fefefe
| 373866 ||  || — || September 17, 2003 || Kitt Peak || Spacewatch || — || align=right data-sort-value="0.70" | 700 m || 
|-id=867 bgcolor=#d6d6d6
| 373867 ||  || — || September 18, 2003 || Piszkéstető || K. Sárneczky, B. Sipőcz || — || align=right | 2.5 km || 
|-id=868 bgcolor=#d6d6d6
| 373868 ||  || — || September 17, 2003 || Palomar || NEAT || — || align=right | 2.8 km || 
|-id=869 bgcolor=#fefefe
| 373869 ||  || — || September 18, 2003 || Palomar || NEAT || FLO || align=right data-sort-value="0.75" | 750 m || 
|-id=870 bgcolor=#fefefe
| 373870 ||  || — || September 18, 2003 || Palomar || NEAT || FLO || align=right data-sort-value="0.57" | 570 m || 
|-id=871 bgcolor=#d6d6d6
| 373871 ||  || — || September 16, 2003 || Kitt Peak || Spacewatch || — || align=right | 2.3 km || 
|-id=872 bgcolor=#d6d6d6
| 373872 ||  || — || September 17, 2003 || Kitt Peak || Spacewatch || CHA || align=right | 2.7 km || 
|-id=873 bgcolor=#fefefe
| 373873 ||  || — || September 18, 2003 || Anderson Mesa || LONEOS || — || align=right data-sort-value="0.87" | 870 m || 
|-id=874 bgcolor=#d6d6d6
| 373874 ||  || — || September 17, 2003 || Socorro || LINEAR || — || align=right | 3.0 km || 
|-id=875 bgcolor=#fefefe
| 373875 ||  || — || September 16, 2003 || Kitt Peak || Spacewatch || — || align=right data-sort-value="0.77" | 770 m || 
|-id=876 bgcolor=#d6d6d6
| 373876 ||  || — || September 18, 2003 || Palomar || NEAT || — || align=right | 2.5 km || 
|-id=877 bgcolor=#fefefe
| 373877 ||  || — || August 26, 2003 || Socorro || LINEAR || — || align=right | 1.0 km || 
|-id=878 bgcolor=#fefefe
| 373878 ||  || — || September 23, 2003 || Haleakala || NEAT || — || align=right data-sort-value="0.77" | 770 m || 
|-id=879 bgcolor=#d6d6d6
| 373879 ||  || — || September 18, 2003 || Kitt Peak || Spacewatch || EOS || align=right | 1.9 km || 
|-id=880 bgcolor=#d6d6d6
| 373880 ||  || — || September 26, 2003 || Desert Eagle || W. K. Y. Yeung || SAN || align=right | 1.7 km || 
|-id=881 bgcolor=#fefefe
| 373881 ||  || — || September 27, 2003 || Socorro || LINEAR || — || align=right data-sort-value="0.80" | 800 m || 
|-id=882 bgcolor=#fefefe
| 373882 ||  || — || September 27, 2003 || Kitt Peak || Spacewatch || — || align=right data-sort-value="0.75" | 750 m || 
|-id=883 bgcolor=#FA8072
| 373883 ||  || — || September 25, 2003 || Palomar || NEAT || — || align=right data-sort-value="0.78" | 780 m || 
|-id=884 bgcolor=#fefefe
| 373884 ||  || — || September 26, 2003 || Socorro || LINEAR || — || align=right data-sort-value="0.70" | 700 m || 
|-id=885 bgcolor=#d6d6d6
| 373885 ||  || — || September 28, 2003 || Anderson Mesa || LONEOS || EOS || align=right | 1.9 km || 
|-id=886 bgcolor=#d6d6d6
| 373886 ||  || — || September 17, 2003 || Palomar || NEAT || KOR || align=right | 1.8 km || 
|-id=887 bgcolor=#d6d6d6
| 373887 ||  || — || September 30, 2003 || Socorro || LINEAR || EOS || align=right | 3.0 km || 
|-id=888 bgcolor=#d6d6d6
| 373888 ||  || — || September 20, 2003 || Kitt Peak || Spacewatch || — || align=right | 2.7 km || 
|-id=889 bgcolor=#d6d6d6
| 373889 ||  || — || September 16, 2003 || Kitt Peak || Spacewatch || — || align=right | 2.8 km || 
|-id=890 bgcolor=#d6d6d6
| 373890 ||  || — || September 18, 2003 || Kitt Peak || Spacewatch || — || align=right | 2.2 km || 
|-id=891 bgcolor=#d6d6d6
| 373891 ||  || — || September 21, 2003 || Kitt Peak || Spacewatch || KOR || align=right | 1.4 km || 
|-id=892 bgcolor=#fefefe
| 373892 ||  || — || September 22, 2003 || Palomar || NEAT || — || align=right data-sort-value="0.65" | 650 m || 
|-id=893 bgcolor=#d6d6d6
| 373893 ||  || — || September 17, 2003 || Kitt Peak || Spacewatch || — || align=right | 2.4 km || 
|-id=894 bgcolor=#d6d6d6
| 373894 ||  || — || September 26, 2003 || Apache Point || SDSS || — || align=right | 2.2 km || 
|-id=895 bgcolor=#fefefe
| 373895 ||  || — || September 26, 2003 || Apache Point || SDSS || — || align=right data-sort-value="0.68" | 680 m || 
|-id=896 bgcolor=#d6d6d6
| 373896 ||  || — || September 26, 2003 || Apache Point || SDSS || KOR || align=right | 1.6 km || 
|-id=897 bgcolor=#FA8072
| 373897 ||  || — || October 15, 2003 || Anderson Mesa || LONEOS || H || align=right data-sort-value="0.56" | 560 m || 
|-id=898 bgcolor=#d6d6d6
| 373898 ||  || — || October 1, 2003 || Kitt Peak || Spacewatch || — || align=right | 2.8 km || 
|-id=899 bgcolor=#fefefe
| 373899 ||  || — || October 2, 2003 || Kitt Peak || Spacewatch || FLO || align=right data-sort-value="0.67" | 670 m || 
|-id=900 bgcolor=#fefefe
| 373900 ||  || — || October 5, 2003 || Kitt Peak || Spacewatch || FLO || align=right data-sort-value="0.58" | 580 m || 
|}

373901–374000 

|-bgcolor=#fefefe
| 373901 ||  || — || October 19, 2003 || Palomar || NEAT || H || align=right data-sort-value="0.69" | 690 m || 
|-id=902 bgcolor=#d6d6d6
| 373902 ||  || — || October 20, 2003 || Palomar || NEAT || — || align=right | 3.5 km || 
|-id=903 bgcolor=#fefefe
| 373903 ||  || — || October 22, 2003 || Kitt Peak || Spacewatch || — || align=right data-sort-value="0.89" | 890 m || 
|-id=904 bgcolor=#fefefe
| 373904 ||  || — || October 24, 2003 || Haleakala || NEAT || — || align=right data-sort-value="0.95" | 950 m || 
|-id=905 bgcolor=#d6d6d6
| 373905 ||  || — || October 16, 2003 || Kitt Peak || Spacewatch || — || align=right | 2.2 km || 
|-id=906 bgcolor=#fefefe
| 373906 ||  || — || October 16, 2003 || Palomar || NEAT || — || align=right data-sort-value="0.94" | 940 m || 
|-id=907 bgcolor=#FA8072
| 373907 ||  || — || September 28, 2003 || Anderson Mesa || LONEOS || — || align=right data-sort-value="0.75" | 750 m || 
|-id=908 bgcolor=#fefefe
| 373908 ||  || — || October 17, 2003 || Anderson Mesa || LONEOS || — || align=right data-sort-value="0.77" | 770 m || 
|-id=909 bgcolor=#fefefe
| 373909 ||  || — || October 17, 2003 || Kitt Peak || Spacewatch || — || align=right data-sort-value="0.76" | 760 m || 
|-id=910 bgcolor=#d6d6d6
| 373910 ||  || — || October 20, 2003 || Palomar || NEAT || — || align=right | 3.7 km || 
|-id=911 bgcolor=#d6d6d6
| 373911 ||  || — || October 18, 2003 || Palomar || NEAT || 629 || align=right | 2.2 km || 
|-id=912 bgcolor=#fefefe
| 373912 ||  || — || October 20, 2003 || Kitt Peak || Spacewatch || — || align=right data-sort-value="0.84" | 840 m || 
|-id=913 bgcolor=#fefefe
| 373913 ||  || — || October 20, 2003 || Kitt Peak || Spacewatch || — || align=right data-sort-value="0.70" | 700 m || 
|-id=914 bgcolor=#d6d6d6
| 373914 ||  || — || October 18, 2003 || Palomar || NEAT || — || align=right | 2.9 km || 
|-id=915 bgcolor=#fefefe
| 373915 ||  || — || October 18, 2003 || Palomar || NEAT || FLO || align=right data-sort-value="0.74" | 740 m || 
|-id=916 bgcolor=#fefefe
| 373916 ||  || — || October 21, 2003 || Socorro || LINEAR || FLO || align=right data-sort-value="0.76" | 760 m || 
|-id=917 bgcolor=#d6d6d6
| 373917 ||  || — || October 20, 2003 || Kitt Peak || Spacewatch || EOS || align=right | 1.8 km || 
|-id=918 bgcolor=#d6d6d6
| 373918 ||  || — || October 21, 2003 || Kitt Peak || Spacewatch || — || align=right | 2.7 km || 
|-id=919 bgcolor=#d6d6d6
| 373919 ||  || — || October 21, 2003 || Palomar || NEAT || EOS || align=right | 2.1 km || 
|-id=920 bgcolor=#fefefe
| 373920 ||  || — || October 20, 2003 || Kitt Peak || Spacewatch || — || align=right data-sort-value="0.72" | 720 m || 
|-id=921 bgcolor=#fefefe
| 373921 ||  || — || September 28, 2003 || Kitt Peak || Spacewatch || — || align=right data-sort-value="0.67" | 670 m || 
|-id=922 bgcolor=#d6d6d6
| 373922 ||  || — || October 21, 2003 || Socorro || LINEAR || — || align=right | 4.4 km || 
|-id=923 bgcolor=#fefefe
| 373923 ||  || — || October 21, 2003 || Kitt Peak || Spacewatch || — || align=right data-sort-value="0.93" | 930 m || 
|-id=924 bgcolor=#fefefe
| 373924 ||  || — || October 23, 2003 || Kitt Peak || Spacewatch || — || align=right data-sort-value="0.76" | 760 m || 
|-id=925 bgcolor=#fefefe
| 373925 ||  || — || September 28, 2003 || Socorro || LINEAR || — || align=right data-sort-value="0.86" | 860 m || 
|-id=926 bgcolor=#fefefe
| 373926 ||  || — || October 24, 2003 || Socorro || LINEAR || NYS || align=right data-sort-value="0.61" | 610 m || 
|-id=927 bgcolor=#d6d6d6
| 373927 ||  || — || October 24, 2003 || Kitt Peak || Spacewatch || — || align=right | 3.1 km || 
|-id=928 bgcolor=#d6d6d6
| 373928 ||  || — || October 24, 2003 || Socorro || LINEAR || — || align=right | 5.1 km || 
|-id=929 bgcolor=#fefefe
| 373929 ||  || — || October 20, 2003 || Kitt Peak || Spacewatch || FLO || align=right data-sort-value="0.79" | 790 m || 
|-id=930 bgcolor=#fefefe
| 373930 ||  || — || October 25, 2003 || Socorro || LINEAR || — || align=right data-sort-value="0.75" | 750 m || 
|-id=931 bgcolor=#d6d6d6
| 373931 ||  || — || October 25, 2003 || Socorro || LINEAR || — || align=right | 2.1 km || 
|-id=932 bgcolor=#d6d6d6
| 373932 ||  || — || September 28, 2003 || Kitt Peak || Spacewatch || EOS || align=right | 1.8 km || 
|-id=933 bgcolor=#d6d6d6
| 373933 ||  || — || October 21, 2003 || Palomar || NEAT || — || align=right | 2.6 km || 
|-id=934 bgcolor=#fefefe
| 373934 ||  || — || October 23, 2003 || Kitt Peak || M. W. Buie || FLO || align=right data-sort-value="0.74" | 740 m || 
|-id=935 bgcolor=#d6d6d6
| 373935 ||  || — || October 16, 2003 || Kitt Peak || Spacewatch || — || align=right | 2.8 km || 
|-id=936 bgcolor=#d6d6d6
| 373936 ||  || — || October 16, 2003 || Palomar || NEAT || — || align=right | 2.6 km || 
|-id=937 bgcolor=#d6d6d6
| 373937 ||  || — || October 28, 2003 || Socorro || LINEAR || — || align=right | 2.7 km || 
|-id=938 bgcolor=#d6d6d6
| 373938 ||  || — || October 16, 2003 || Kitt Peak || Spacewatch || KOR || align=right | 1.4 km || 
|-id=939 bgcolor=#d6d6d6
| 373939 ||  || — || October 17, 2003 || Apache Point || SDSS || CHA || align=right | 2.2 km || 
|-id=940 bgcolor=#d6d6d6
| 373940 ||  || — || October 19, 2003 || Kitt Peak || Spacewatch || BRA || align=right | 1.5 km || 
|-id=941 bgcolor=#d6d6d6
| 373941 ||  || — || October 20, 2003 || Kitt Peak || Spacewatch || — || align=right | 3.1 km || 
|-id=942 bgcolor=#fefefe
| 373942 ||  || — || October 22, 2003 || Apache Point || SDSS || — || align=right data-sort-value="0.87" | 870 m || 
|-id=943 bgcolor=#d6d6d6
| 373943 ||  || — || October 22, 2003 || Apache Point || SDSS || — || align=right | 2.0 km || 
|-id=944 bgcolor=#d6d6d6
| 373944 ||  || — || October 22, 2003 || Apache Point || SDSS || — || align=right | 3.0 km || 
|-id=945 bgcolor=#d6d6d6
| 373945 ||  || — || October 23, 2003 || Apache Point || SDSS || KOR || align=right | 1.4 km || 
|-id=946 bgcolor=#fefefe
| 373946 ||  || — || October 23, 2003 || Apache Point || SDSS || — || align=right data-sort-value="0.72" | 720 m || 
|-id=947 bgcolor=#fefefe
| 373947 ||  || — || November 14, 2003 || Palomar || NEAT || PHO || align=right | 1.5 km || 
|-id=948 bgcolor=#d6d6d6
| 373948 ||  || — || November 16, 2003 || Catalina || CSS || EOS || align=right | 2.3 km || 
|-id=949 bgcolor=#fefefe
| 373949 ||  || — || November 18, 2003 || Palomar || NEAT || — || align=right | 1.0 km || 
|-id=950 bgcolor=#fefefe
| 373950 ||  || — || November 20, 2003 || Socorro || LINEAR || H || align=right data-sort-value="0.85" | 850 m || 
|-id=951 bgcolor=#fefefe
| 373951 ||  || — || November 18, 2003 || Palomar || NEAT || — || align=right data-sort-value="0.75" | 750 m || 
|-id=952 bgcolor=#fefefe
| 373952 ||  || — || November 18, 2003 || Kitt Peak || Spacewatch || — || align=right data-sort-value="0.73" | 730 m || 
|-id=953 bgcolor=#fefefe
| 373953 ||  || — || November 19, 2003 || Kitt Peak || Spacewatch || NYS || align=right data-sort-value="0.56" | 560 m || 
|-id=954 bgcolor=#d6d6d6
| 373954 ||  || — || November 19, 2003 || Kitt Peak || Spacewatch || — || align=right | 3.2 km || 
|-id=955 bgcolor=#d6d6d6
| 373955 ||  || — || November 19, 2003 || Kitt Peak || Spacewatch || — || align=right | 5.4 km || 
|-id=956 bgcolor=#fefefe
| 373956 ||  || — || November 19, 2003 || Kitt Peak || Spacewatch || FLO || align=right data-sort-value="0.52" | 520 m || 
|-id=957 bgcolor=#d6d6d6
| 373957 ||  || — || November 20, 2003 || Socorro || LINEAR || — || align=right | 3.9 km || 
|-id=958 bgcolor=#fefefe
| 373958 ||  || — || October 28, 2003 || Socorro || LINEAR || FLO || align=right data-sort-value="0.67" | 670 m || 
|-id=959 bgcolor=#d6d6d6
| 373959 ||  || — || November 20, 2003 || Socorro || LINEAR || — || align=right | 3.4 km || 
|-id=960 bgcolor=#d6d6d6
| 373960 ||  || — || November 20, 2003 || Socorro || LINEAR || — || align=right | 3.0 km || 
|-id=961 bgcolor=#fefefe
| 373961 ||  || — || November 21, 2003 || Socorro || LINEAR || — || align=right data-sort-value="0.83" | 830 m || 
|-id=962 bgcolor=#d6d6d6
| 373962 ||  || — || November 29, 2003 || Socorro || LINEAR || — || align=right | 3.7 km || 
|-id=963 bgcolor=#d6d6d6
| 373963 ||  || — || November 22, 2003 || Kitt Peak || M. W. Buie || — || align=right | 2.8 km || 
|-id=964 bgcolor=#fefefe
| 373964 ||  || — || November 16, 2003 || Catalina || CSS || — || align=right data-sort-value="0.74" | 740 m || 
|-id=965 bgcolor=#d6d6d6
| 373965 ||  || — || November 24, 2003 || Kitt Peak || Spacewatch || — || align=right | 2.3 km || 
|-id=966 bgcolor=#d6d6d6
| 373966 ||  || — || December 1, 2003 || Socorro || LINEAR || — || align=right | 5.1 km || 
|-id=967 bgcolor=#d6d6d6
| 373967 ||  || — || December 1, 2003 || Kitt Peak || Spacewatch || EMA || align=right | 6.4 km || 
|-id=968 bgcolor=#d6d6d6
| 373968 ||  || — || December 1, 2003 || Kitt Peak || Spacewatch || EOS || align=right | 1.7 km || 
|-id=969 bgcolor=#fefefe
| 373969 ||  || — || December 16, 2003 || Anderson Mesa || LONEOS || — || align=right data-sort-value="0.92" | 920 m || 
|-id=970 bgcolor=#d6d6d6
| 373970 ||  || — || December 17, 2003 || Socorro || LINEAR || — || align=right | 3.9 km || 
|-id=971 bgcolor=#d6d6d6
| 373971 ||  || — || December 18, 2003 || Socorro || LINEAR || — || align=right | 3.0 km || 
|-id=972 bgcolor=#d6d6d6
| 373972 ||  || — || December 18, 2003 || Socorro || LINEAR || — || align=right | 3.5 km || 
|-id=973 bgcolor=#d6d6d6
| 373973 ||  || — || December 19, 2003 || Socorro || LINEAR || — || align=right | 4.7 km || 
|-id=974 bgcolor=#fefefe
| 373974 ||  || — || December 18, 2003 || Socorro || LINEAR || FLO || align=right | 1.1 km || 
|-id=975 bgcolor=#fefefe
| 373975 ||  || — || December 1, 2003 || Socorro || LINEAR || — || align=right data-sort-value="0.87" | 870 m || 
|-id=976 bgcolor=#d6d6d6
| 373976 ||  || — || December 19, 2003 || Socorro || LINEAR || — || align=right | 3.9 km || 
|-id=977 bgcolor=#d6d6d6
| 373977 ||  || — || December 23, 2003 || Socorro || LINEAR || — || align=right | 4.7 km || 
|-id=978 bgcolor=#fefefe
| 373978 ||  || — || December 27, 2003 || Socorro || LINEAR || — || align=right data-sort-value="0.98" | 980 m || 
|-id=979 bgcolor=#d6d6d6
| 373979 ||  || — || December 28, 2003 || Socorro || LINEAR || — || align=right | 3.5 km || 
|-id=980 bgcolor=#d6d6d6
| 373980 ||  || — || December 27, 2003 || Socorro || LINEAR || — || align=right | 4.2 km || 
|-id=981 bgcolor=#d6d6d6
| 373981 ||  || — || December 28, 2003 || Socorro || LINEAR || — || align=right | 4.2 km || 
|-id=982 bgcolor=#d6d6d6
| 373982 ||  || — || December 28, 2003 || Socorro || LINEAR || — || align=right | 2.8 km || 
|-id=983 bgcolor=#d6d6d6
| 373983 ||  || — || December 17, 2003 || Socorro || LINEAR || ALA || align=right | 6.4 km || 
|-id=984 bgcolor=#d6d6d6
| 373984 ||  || — || December 17, 2003 || Socorro || LINEAR || — || align=right | 3.3 km || 
|-id=985 bgcolor=#C2FFFF
| 373985 ||  || — || December 17, 2003 || Kitt Peak || Spacewatch || L5 || align=right | 12 km || 
|-id=986 bgcolor=#d6d6d6
| 373986 || 2004 AK || — || January 11, 2004 || Wrightwood || J. W. Young || — || align=right | 3.5 km || 
|-id=987 bgcolor=#d6d6d6
| 373987 ||  || — || January 15, 2004 || Kitt Peak || Spacewatch || — || align=right | 2.7 km || 
|-id=988 bgcolor=#d6d6d6
| 373988 ||  || — || January 16, 2004 || Palomar || NEAT || HYG || align=right | 3.1 km || 
|-id=989 bgcolor=#d6d6d6
| 373989 ||  || — || January 16, 2004 || Palomar || NEAT || — || align=right | 4.2 km || 
|-id=990 bgcolor=#d6d6d6
| 373990 ||  || — || January 17, 2004 || Palomar || NEAT || — || align=right | 2.3 km || 
|-id=991 bgcolor=#fefefe
| 373991 ||  || — || January 18, 2004 || Palomar || NEAT || — || align=right | 1.5 km || 
|-id=992 bgcolor=#fefefe
| 373992 ||  || — || January 19, 2004 || Anderson Mesa || LONEOS || — || align=right data-sort-value="0.64" | 640 m || 
|-id=993 bgcolor=#d6d6d6
| 373993 ||  || — || January 19, 2004 || Kitt Peak || Spacewatch || THM || align=right | 2.2 km || 
|-id=994 bgcolor=#fefefe
| 373994 ||  || — || January 21, 2004 || Socorro || LINEAR || NYS || align=right data-sort-value="0.77" | 770 m || 
|-id=995 bgcolor=#fefefe
| 373995 ||  || — || January 24, 2004 || Socorro || LINEAR || NYS || align=right data-sort-value="0.66" | 660 m || 
|-id=996 bgcolor=#fefefe
| 373996 ||  || — || January 23, 2004 || Socorro || LINEAR || ERI || align=right | 1.7 km || 
|-id=997 bgcolor=#d6d6d6
| 373997 ||  || — || January 27, 2004 || Anderson Mesa || LONEOS || — || align=right | 3.9 km || 
|-id=998 bgcolor=#d6d6d6
| 373998 ||  || — || January 26, 2004 || Anderson Mesa || LONEOS || — || align=right | 4.6 km || 
|-id=999 bgcolor=#d6d6d6
| 373999 ||  || — || January 30, 2004 || Catalina || CSS || THB || align=right | 4.6 km || 
|-id=000 bgcolor=#d6d6d6
| 374000 ||  || — || January 30, 2004 || Catalina || CSS || — || align=right | 3.8 km || 
|}

References

External links 
 Discovery Circumstances: Numbered Minor Planets (370001)–(375000) (IAU Minor Planet Center)

0373